

320001–320100 

|-bgcolor=#C2FFFF
| 320001 ||  || — || February 17, 2007 || Kitt Peak || Spacewatch || L5 || align=right | 6.7 km || 
|-id=002 bgcolor=#d6d6d6
| 320002 ||  || — || February 17, 2007 || Kitt Peak || Spacewatch || KOR || align=right | 2.0 km || 
|-id=003 bgcolor=#d6d6d6
| 320003 ||  || — || February 17, 2007 || Kitt Peak || Spacewatch || — || align=right | 3.2 km || 
|-id=004 bgcolor=#d6d6d6
| 320004 ||  || — || February 17, 2007 || Kitt Peak || Spacewatch || URS || align=right | 3.6 km || 
|-id=005 bgcolor=#d6d6d6
| 320005 ||  || — || February 17, 2007 || Kitt Peak || Spacewatch || URS || align=right | 4.8 km || 
|-id=006 bgcolor=#d6d6d6
| 320006 ||  || — || February 17, 2007 || Kitt Peak || Spacewatch || EOS || align=right | 2.6 km || 
|-id=007 bgcolor=#d6d6d6
| 320007 ||  || — || February 17, 2007 || Kitt Peak || Spacewatch || CHA || align=right | 2.4 km || 
|-id=008 bgcolor=#d6d6d6
| 320008 ||  || — || February 17, 2007 || Kitt Peak || Spacewatch || — || align=right | 4.1 km || 
|-id=009 bgcolor=#d6d6d6
| 320009 ||  || — || February 17, 2007 || Kitt Peak || Spacewatch || — || align=right | 4.1 km || 
|-id=010 bgcolor=#d6d6d6
| 320010 ||  || — || February 17, 2007 || Kitt Peak || Spacewatch || — || align=right | 4.5 km || 
|-id=011 bgcolor=#E9E9E9
| 320011 ||  || — || February 21, 2007 || Socorro || LINEAR || — || align=right | 2.6 km || 
|-id=012 bgcolor=#d6d6d6
| 320012 ||  || — || February 22, 2007 || Altschwendt || W. Ries || — || align=right | 2.2 km || 
|-id=013 bgcolor=#fefefe
| 320013 ||  || — || February 19, 2007 || Mount Lemmon || Mount Lemmon Survey || FLO || align=right data-sort-value="0.85" | 850 m || 
|-id=014 bgcolor=#d6d6d6
| 320014 ||  || — || February 21, 2007 || Kitt Peak || Spacewatch || — || align=right | 2.7 km || 
|-id=015 bgcolor=#fefefe
| 320015 ||  || — || August 28, 2005 || Kitt Peak || Spacewatch || — || align=right data-sort-value="0.84" | 840 m || 
|-id=016 bgcolor=#fefefe
| 320016 ||  || — || February 21, 2007 || Kitt Peak || Spacewatch || H || align=right data-sort-value="0.80" | 800 m || 
|-id=017 bgcolor=#fefefe
| 320017 ||  || — || February 21, 2007 || Catalina || CSS || H || align=right data-sort-value="0.99" | 990 m || 
|-id=018 bgcolor=#d6d6d6
| 320018 ||  || — || February 21, 2007 || Kitt Peak || Spacewatch || EOS || align=right | 1.6 km || 
|-id=019 bgcolor=#d6d6d6
| 320019 ||  || — || October 1, 2005 || Kitt Peak || Spacewatch || — || align=right | 1.6 km || 
|-id=020 bgcolor=#d6d6d6
| 320020 ||  || — || February 21, 2007 || Kitt Peak || Spacewatch || — || align=right | 2.5 km || 
|-id=021 bgcolor=#d6d6d6
| 320021 ||  || — || February 21, 2007 || Kitt Peak || Spacewatch || HYG || align=right | 3.0 km || 
|-id=022 bgcolor=#d6d6d6
| 320022 ||  || — || February 21, 2007 || Kitt Peak || Spacewatch || — || align=right | 3.1 km || 
|-id=023 bgcolor=#d6d6d6
| 320023 ||  || — || February 21, 2007 || Kitt Peak || Spacewatch || — || align=right | 3.0 km || 
|-id=024 bgcolor=#d6d6d6
| 320024 ||  || — || February 21, 2007 || Mount Lemmon || Mount Lemmon Survey || KOR || align=right | 1.4 km || 
|-id=025 bgcolor=#d6d6d6
| 320025 ||  || — || February 22, 2007 || Anderson Mesa || LONEOS || — || align=right | 3.2 km || 
|-id=026 bgcolor=#d6d6d6
| 320026 ||  || — || February 21, 2007 || Mount Lemmon || Mount Lemmon Survey || — || align=right | 2.9 km || 
|-id=027 bgcolor=#d6d6d6
| 320027 ||  || — || February 23, 2007 || Mount Lemmon || Mount Lemmon Survey || — || align=right | 3.8 km || 
|-id=028 bgcolor=#E9E9E9
| 320028 ||  || — || February 23, 2007 || Kitt Peak || Spacewatch || AST || align=right | 1.9 km || 
|-id=029 bgcolor=#d6d6d6
| 320029 ||  || — || February 23, 2007 || Kitt Peak || Spacewatch || — || align=right | 3.3 km || 
|-id=030 bgcolor=#d6d6d6
| 320030 ||  || — || February 23, 2007 || Kitt Peak || Spacewatch || — || align=right | 2.7 km || 
|-id=031 bgcolor=#d6d6d6
| 320031 ||  || — || February 23, 2007 || Kitt Peak || Spacewatch || — || align=right | 2.7 km || 
|-id=032 bgcolor=#fefefe
| 320032 ||  || — || February 23, 2007 || Kitt Peak || Spacewatch || V || align=right data-sort-value="0.84" | 840 m || 
|-id=033 bgcolor=#fefefe
| 320033 ||  || — || February 23, 2007 || Kitt Peak || Spacewatch || — || align=right data-sort-value="0.84" | 840 m || 
|-id=034 bgcolor=#d6d6d6
| 320034 ||  || — || February 25, 2007 || Mount Lemmon || Mount Lemmon Survey || — || align=right | 2.3 km || 
|-id=035 bgcolor=#E9E9E9
| 320035 ||  || — || February 17, 2007 || Mount Lemmon || Mount Lemmon Survey || — || align=right | 2.8 km || 
|-id=036 bgcolor=#d6d6d6
| 320036 ||  || — || February 23, 2007 || Mount Lemmon || Mount Lemmon Survey || — || align=right | 2.5 km || 
|-id=037 bgcolor=#E9E9E9
| 320037 ||  || — || February 22, 2007 || Mount Graham || VATT || AGN || align=right | 1.3 km || 
|-id=038 bgcolor=#d6d6d6
| 320038 ||  || — || February 22, 2007 || Mount Graham || VATT || KOR || align=right | 1.2 km || 
|-id=039 bgcolor=#d6d6d6
| 320039 ||  || — || February 26, 2007 || Mount Lemmon || Mount Lemmon Survey || MEL || align=right | 3.5 km || 
|-id=040 bgcolor=#d6d6d6
| 320040 ||  || — || February 26, 2007 || Mount Lemmon || Mount Lemmon Survey || — || align=right | 3.2 km || 
|-id=041 bgcolor=#d6d6d6
| 320041 ||  || — || February 26, 2007 || Mount Lemmon || Mount Lemmon Survey || — || align=right | 3.2 km || 
|-id=042 bgcolor=#d6d6d6
| 320042 ||  || — || February 26, 2007 || Mount Lemmon || Mount Lemmon Survey || — || align=right | 3.1 km || 
|-id=043 bgcolor=#d6d6d6
| 320043 ||  || — || February 26, 2007 || Mount Lemmon || Mount Lemmon Survey || — || align=right | 2.9 km || 
|-id=044 bgcolor=#d6d6d6
| 320044 ||  || — || February 26, 2007 || Mount Lemmon || Mount Lemmon Survey || — || align=right | 4.7 km || 
|-id=045 bgcolor=#d6d6d6
| 320045 ||  || — || February 16, 2007 || Catalina || CSS || — || align=right | 4.8 km || 
|-id=046 bgcolor=#d6d6d6
| 320046 ||  || — || February 16, 2007 || Catalina || CSS || — || align=right | 5.2 km || 
|-id=047 bgcolor=#C2FFFF
| 320047 ||  || — || February 17, 2007 || Kitt Peak || Spacewatch || L5 || align=right | 12 km || 
|-id=048 bgcolor=#E9E9E9
| 320048 ||  || — || March 6, 2007 || Palomar || NEAT || DOR || align=right | 2.8 km || 
|-id=049 bgcolor=#d6d6d6
| 320049 ||  || — || March 9, 2007 || Kitt Peak || Spacewatch || — || align=right | 2.0 km || 
|-id=050 bgcolor=#E9E9E9
| 320050 ||  || — || March 9, 2007 || Mount Lemmon || Mount Lemmon Survey || — || align=right | 2.6 km || 
|-id=051 bgcolor=#fefefe
| 320051 ||  || — || March 9, 2007 || Catalina || CSS || — || align=right | 1.6 km || 
|-id=052 bgcolor=#fefefe
| 320052 ||  || — || March 9, 2007 || Mount Lemmon || Mount Lemmon Survey || MAS || align=right data-sort-value="0.78" | 780 m || 
|-id=053 bgcolor=#d6d6d6
| 320053 ||  || — || March 9, 2007 || Mount Lemmon || Mount Lemmon Survey || EOS || align=right | 2.8 km || 
|-id=054 bgcolor=#d6d6d6
| 320054 ||  || — || March 9, 2007 || Kitt Peak || Spacewatch || KOR || align=right | 1.9 km || 
|-id=055 bgcolor=#d6d6d6
| 320055 ||  || — || March 9, 2007 || Palomar || NEAT || CHA || align=right | 3.2 km || 
|-id=056 bgcolor=#d6d6d6
| 320056 ||  || — || March 10, 2007 || Kitt Peak || Spacewatch || — || align=right | 2.7 km || 
|-id=057 bgcolor=#d6d6d6
| 320057 ||  || — || March 10, 2007 || Kitt Peak || Spacewatch || EOS || align=right | 2.3 km || 
|-id=058 bgcolor=#d6d6d6
| 320058 ||  || — || February 25, 2007 || Kitt Peak || Spacewatch || THM || align=right | 2.4 km || 
|-id=059 bgcolor=#d6d6d6
| 320059 ||  || — || March 10, 2007 || Palomar || NEAT || — || align=right | 4.5 km || 
|-id=060 bgcolor=#E9E9E9
| 320060 ||  || — || March 11, 2007 || Marly || P. Kocher || — || align=right | 2.8 km || 
|-id=061 bgcolor=#d6d6d6
| 320061 ||  || — || March 9, 2007 || Kitt Peak || Spacewatch || VER || align=right | 3.5 km || 
|-id=062 bgcolor=#d6d6d6
| 320062 ||  || — || March 9, 2007 || Palomar || NEAT || — || align=right | 4.0 km || 
|-id=063 bgcolor=#d6d6d6
| 320063 ||  || — || March 10, 2007 || Mount Lemmon || Mount Lemmon Survey || KOR || align=right | 1.3 km || 
|-id=064 bgcolor=#E9E9E9
| 320064 ||  || — || March 10, 2007 || Palomar || NEAT || PAD || align=right | 2.6 km || 
|-id=065 bgcolor=#d6d6d6
| 320065 Erbaghjolu ||  ||  || March 11, 2007 || Vicques || M. Ory || EOS || align=right | 2.4 km || 
|-id=066 bgcolor=#C2FFFF
| 320066 ||  || — || March 11, 2007 || Kitt Peak || Spacewatch || L5 || align=right | 11 km || 
|-id=067 bgcolor=#fefefe
| 320067 ||  || — || March 11, 2007 || Kitt Peak || Spacewatch || H || align=right data-sort-value="0.77" | 770 m || 
|-id=068 bgcolor=#d6d6d6
| 320068 ||  || — || March 9, 2007 || Kitt Peak || Spacewatch || — || align=right | 2.8 km || 
|-id=069 bgcolor=#E9E9E9
| 320069 ||  || — || March 9, 2007 || Kitt Peak || Spacewatch || — || align=right | 2.3 km || 
|-id=070 bgcolor=#d6d6d6
| 320070 ||  || — || March 9, 2007 || Kitt Peak || Spacewatch || — || align=right | 3.5 km || 
|-id=071 bgcolor=#d6d6d6
| 320071 ||  || — || March 9, 2007 || Kitt Peak || Spacewatch || — || align=right | 2.9 km || 
|-id=072 bgcolor=#E9E9E9
| 320072 ||  || — || March 9, 2007 || Kitt Peak || Spacewatch || — || align=right | 4.0 km || 
|-id=073 bgcolor=#d6d6d6
| 320073 ||  || — || March 10, 2007 || Kitt Peak || Spacewatch || — || align=right | 2.8 km || 
|-id=074 bgcolor=#d6d6d6
| 320074 ||  || — || March 10, 2007 || Mount Lemmon || Mount Lemmon Survey || — || align=right | 3.3 km || 
|-id=075 bgcolor=#d6d6d6
| 320075 ||  || — || March 10, 2007 || Mount Lemmon || Mount Lemmon Survey || EOS || align=right | 2.6 km || 
|-id=076 bgcolor=#d6d6d6
| 320076 ||  || — || March 11, 2007 || Mount Lemmon || Mount Lemmon Survey || — || align=right | 3.6 km || 
|-id=077 bgcolor=#d6d6d6
| 320077 ||  || — || February 17, 2007 || Kitt Peak || Spacewatch || THM || align=right | 2.7 km || 
|-id=078 bgcolor=#E9E9E9
| 320078 ||  || — || March 10, 2007 || Kitt Peak || Spacewatch || — || align=right | 1.8 km || 
|-id=079 bgcolor=#d6d6d6
| 320079 ||  || — || March 10, 2007 || Kitt Peak || Spacewatch || THM || align=right | 2.5 km || 
|-id=080 bgcolor=#d6d6d6
| 320080 ||  || — || March 10, 2007 || Kitt Peak || Spacewatch || — || align=right | 2.5 km || 
|-id=081 bgcolor=#d6d6d6
| 320081 ||  || — || March 10, 2007 || Kitt Peak || Spacewatch || KOR || align=right | 1.7 km || 
|-id=082 bgcolor=#d6d6d6
| 320082 ||  || — || March 10, 2007 || Mount Lemmon || Mount Lemmon Survey || — || align=right | 4.0 km || 
|-id=083 bgcolor=#d6d6d6
| 320083 ||  || — || March 10, 2007 || Kitt Peak || Spacewatch || — || align=right | 3.9 km || 
|-id=084 bgcolor=#fefefe
| 320084 ||  || — || March 10, 2007 || Kitt Peak || Spacewatch || NYS || align=right data-sort-value="0.73" | 730 m || 
|-id=085 bgcolor=#d6d6d6
| 320085 ||  || — || March 10, 2007 || Mount Lemmon || Mount Lemmon Survey || VER || align=right | 3.1 km || 
|-id=086 bgcolor=#d6d6d6
| 320086 ||  || — || March 10, 2007 || Palomar || NEAT || — || align=right | 3.7 km || 
|-id=087 bgcolor=#d6d6d6
| 320087 ||  || — || March 12, 2007 || Kitt Peak || Spacewatch || — || align=right | 6.0 km || 
|-id=088 bgcolor=#d6d6d6
| 320088 ||  || — || March 14, 2007 || Wrightwood || J. W. Young || — || align=right | 3.7 km || 
|-id=089 bgcolor=#fefefe
| 320089 ||  || — || March 9, 2007 || Mount Lemmon || Mount Lemmon Survey || — || align=right data-sort-value="0.67" | 670 m || 
|-id=090 bgcolor=#E9E9E9
| 320090 ||  || — || March 10, 2007 || Kitt Peak || Spacewatch || — || align=right | 2.3 km || 
|-id=091 bgcolor=#d6d6d6
| 320091 ||  || — || March 10, 2007 || Mount Lemmon || Mount Lemmon Survey || — || align=right | 4.2 km || 
|-id=092 bgcolor=#d6d6d6
| 320092 ||  || — || March 11, 2007 || Kitt Peak || Spacewatch || — || align=right | 2.3 km || 
|-id=093 bgcolor=#C2FFFF
| 320093 ||  || — || March 11, 2007 || Kitt Peak || Spacewatch || L5 || align=right | 9.9 km || 
|-id=094 bgcolor=#d6d6d6
| 320094 ||  || — || March 11, 2007 || Kitt Peak || Spacewatch || — || align=right | 3.7 km || 
|-id=095 bgcolor=#d6d6d6
| 320095 ||  || — || March 11, 2007 || Kitt Peak || Spacewatch || — || align=right | 3.6 km || 
|-id=096 bgcolor=#d6d6d6
| 320096 ||  || — || March 11, 2007 || Kitt Peak || Spacewatch || — || align=right | 3.1 km || 
|-id=097 bgcolor=#d6d6d6
| 320097 ||  || — || March 11, 2007 || Mount Lemmon || Mount Lemmon Survey || — || align=right | 2.6 km || 
|-id=098 bgcolor=#fefefe
| 320098 ||  || — || March 11, 2007 || Kitt Peak || Spacewatch || H || align=right data-sort-value="0.73" | 730 m || 
|-id=099 bgcolor=#d6d6d6
| 320099 ||  || — || March 11, 2007 || Kitt Peak || Spacewatch || — || align=right | 2.7 km || 
|-id=100 bgcolor=#d6d6d6
| 320100 ||  || — || March 13, 2007 || Mount Lemmon || Mount Lemmon Survey || — || align=right | 3.6 km || 
|}

320101–320200 

|-bgcolor=#d6d6d6
| 320101 ||  || — || March 13, 2007 || Mount Lemmon || Mount Lemmon Survey || — || align=right | 4.4 km || 
|-id=102 bgcolor=#d6d6d6
| 320102 ||  || — || March 13, 2007 || Mount Lemmon || Mount Lemmon Survey || — || align=right | 2.9 km || 
|-id=103 bgcolor=#d6d6d6
| 320103 ||  || — || March 14, 2007 || Anderson Mesa || LONEOS || — || align=right | 4.8 km || 
|-id=104 bgcolor=#E9E9E9
| 320104 ||  || — || March 9, 2007 || Mount Lemmon || Mount Lemmon Survey || — || align=right data-sort-value="0.90" | 900 m || 
|-id=105 bgcolor=#d6d6d6
| 320105 ||  || — || March 9, 2007 || Mount Lemmon || Mount Lemmon Survey || — || align=right | 3.6 km || 
|-id=106 bgcolor=#d6d6d6
| 320106 ||  || — || March 9, 2007 || Mount Lemmon || Mount Lemmon Survey || THM || align=right | 2.9 km || 
|-id=107 bgcolor=#d6d6d6
| 320107 ||  || — || March 9, 2007 || Mount Lemmon || Mount Lemmon Survey || KOR || align=right | 1.7 km || 
|-id=108 bgcolor=#d6d6d6
| 320108 ||  || — || March 9, 2007 || Mount Lemmon || Mount Lemmon Survey || THM || align=right | 2.7 km || 
|-id=109 bgcolor=#d6d6d6
| 320109 ||  || — || March 10, 2007 || Mount Lemmon || Mount Lemmon Survey || — || align=right | 3.1 km || 
|-id=110 bgcolor=#d6d6d6
| 320110 ||  || — || February 26, 2007 || Mount Lemmon || Mount Lemmon Survey || — || align=right | 2.9 km || 
|-id=111 bgcolor=#d6d6d6
| 320111 ||  || — || March 12, 2007 || Mount Lemmon || Mount Lemmon Survey || — || align=right | 3.5 km || 
|-id=112 bgcolor=#d6d6d6
| 320112 ||  || — || March 12, 2007 || Kitt Peak || Spacewatch || EOS || align=right | 2.4 km || 
|-id=113 bgcolor=#d6d6d6
| 320113 ||  || — || March 14, 2007 || Kitt Peak || Spacewatch || — || align=right | 2.8 km || 
|-id=114 bgcolor=#d6d6d6
| 320114 ||  || — || March 11, 2007 || Mount Lemmon || Mount Lemmon Survey || URS || align=right | 4.1 km || 
|-id=115 bgcolor=#d6d6d6
| 320115 ||  || — || March 13, 2007 || Kitt Peak || Spacewatch || — || align=right | 3.1 km || 
|-id=116 bgcolor=#E9E9E9
| 320116 ||  || — || March 14, 2007 || Mount Lemmon || Mount Lemmon Survey || HOF || align=right | 2.6 km || 
|-id=117 bgcolor=#d6d6d6
| 320117 ||  || — || March 13, 2007 || Kitt Peak || Spacewatch || — || align=right | 2.5 km || 
|-id=118 bgcolor=#d6d6d6
| 320118 ||  || — || March 14, 2007 || Kitt Peak || Spacewatch || EOS || align=right | 2.5 km || 
|-id=119 bgcolor=#d6d6d6
| 320119 ||  || — || March 14, 2007 || Kitt Peak || Spacewatch || — || align=right | 3.5 km || 
|-id=120 bgcolor=#d6d6d6
| 320120 ||  || — || March 14, 2007 || Kitt Peak || Spacewatch || — || align=right | 2.8 km || 
|-id=121 bgcolor=#d6d6d6
| 320121 ||  || — || March 14, 2007 || Kitt Peak || Spacewatch || — || align=right | 3.1 km || 
|-id=122 bgcolor=#d6d6d6
| 320122 ||  || — || March 14, 2007 || Mount Lemmon || Mount Lemmon Survey || — || align=right | 3.1 km || 
|-id=123 bgcolor=#d6d6d6
| 320123 ||  || — || March 14, 2007 || Kitt Peak || Spacewatch || — || align=right | 3.8 km || 
|-id=124 bgcolor=#d6d6d6
| 320124 ||  || — || March 15, 2007 || Mount Lemmon || Mount Lemmon Survey || — || align=right | 4.1 km || 
|-id=125 bgcolor=#d6d6d6
| 320125 ||  || — || March 14, 2007 || Mount Lemmon || Mount Lemmon Survey || — || align=right | 3.9 km || 
|-id=126 bgcolor=#d6d6d6
| 320126 ||  || — || March 15, 2007 || Mount Lemmon || Mount Lemmon Survey || — || align=right | 3.4 km || 
|-id=127 bgcolor=#d6d6d6
| 320127 ||  || — || March 13, 2007 || Kitt Peak || Spacewatch || EOS || align=right | 2.1 km || 
|-id=128 bgcolor=#d6d6d6
| 320128 ||  || — || March 15, 2007 || Mount Lemmon || Mount Lemmon Survey || — || align=right | 4.3 km || 
|-id=129 bgcolor=#d6d6d6
| 320129 ||  || — || March 15, 2007 || Kitt Peak || Spacewatch || — || align=right | 3.3 km || 
|-id=130 bgcolor=#d6d6d6
| 320130 ||  || — || March 15, 2007 || Kitt Peak || Spacewatch || — || align=right | 2.4 km || 
|-id=131 bgcolor=#d6d6d6
| 320131 ||  || — || March 15, 2007 || Kitt Peak || Spacewatch || — || align=right | 4.3 km || 
|-id=132 bgcolor=#d6d6d6
| 320132 ||  || — || March 15, 2007 || Kitt Peak || Spacewatch || — || align=right | 3.6 km || 
|-id=133 bgcolor=#d6d6d6
| 320133 ||  || — || March 6, 2007 || Palomar || NEAT || — || align=right | 3.9 km || 
|-id=134 bgcolor=#d6d6d6
| 320134 ||  || — || October 20, 1995 || Kitt Peak || Spacewatch || — || align=right | 2.7 km || 
|-id=135 bgcolor=#d6d6d6
| 320135 ||  || — || March 11, 2007 || Kitt Peak || Spacewatch || EOS || align=right | 2.3 km || 
|-id=136 bgcolor=#d6d6d6
| 320136 ||  || — || March 12, 2007 || Kitt Peak || Spacewatch || TEL || align=right | 1.6 km || 
|-id=137 bgcolor=#d6d6d6
| 320137 ||  || — || March 13, 2007 || Kitt Peak || Spacewatch || — || align=right | 2.5 km || 
|-id=138 bgcolor=#d6d6d6
| 320138 ||  || — || March 10, 2007 || Mount Lemmon || Mount Lemmon Survey || — || align=right | 3.6 km || 
|-id=139 bgcolor=#d6d6d6
| 320139 ||  || — || March 13, 2007 || Mount Lemmon || Mount Lemmon Survey || — || align=right | 3.1 km || 
|-id=140 bgcolor=#d6d6d6
| 320140 ||  || — || March 10, 2007 || Mount Lemmon || Mount Lemmon Survey || — || align=right | 2.6 km || 
|-id=141 bgcolor=#d6d6d6
| 320141 ||  || — || March 12, 2007 || Catalina || CSS || ALA || align=right | 6.1 km || 
|-id=142 bgcolor=#d6d6d6
| 320142 ||  || — || March 11, 2007 || Anderson Mesa || LONEOS || — || align=right | 4.9 km || 
|-id=143 bgcolor=#d6d6d6
| 320143 ||  || — || March 9, 2007 || Mount Lemmon || Mount Lemmon Survey || — || align=right | 2.6 km || 
|-id=144 bgcolor=#d6d6d6
| 320144 ||  || — || March 11, 2007 || Mount Lemmon || Mount Lemmon Survey || TIR || align=right | 4.0 km || 
|-id=145 bgcolor=#d6d6d6
| 320145 ||  || — || March 11, 2007 || Catalina || CSS || — || align=right | 4.3 km || 
|-id=146 bgcolor=#E9E9E9
| 320146 ||  || — || January 21, 2002 || Kitt Peak || Spacewatch || HEN || align=right | 1.2 km || 
|-id=147 bgcolor=#d6d6d6
| 320147 ||  || — || March 16, 2007 || Catalina || CSS || — || align=right | 3.7 km || 
|-id=148 bgcolor=#d6d6d6
| 320148 ||  || — || February 26, 2007 || Mount Lemmon || Mount Lemmon Survey || — || align=right | 3.3 km || 
|-id=149 bgcolor=#d6d6d6
| 320149 ||  || — || March 16, 2007 || Kitt Peak || Spacewatch || — || align=right | 3.5 km || 
|-id=150 bgcolor=#fefefe
| 320150 ||  || — || March 17, 2007 || Socorro || LINEAR || — || align=right | 1.0 km || 
|-id=151 bgcolor=#d6d6d6
| 320151 ||  || — || March 20, 2007 || Mount Lemmon || Mount Lemmon Survey || — || align=right | 3.0 km || 
|-id=152 bgcolor=#d6d6d6
| 320152 ||  || — || March 20, 2007 || Mount Lemmon || Mount Lemmon Survey || — || align=right | 4.1 km || 
|-id=153 bgcolor=#d6d6d6
| 320153 Eglitis ||  ||  || March 23, 2007 || Moletai || K. Černis || — || align=right | 4.4 km || 
|-id=154 bgcolor=#d6d6d6
| 320154 ||  || — || March 20, 2007 || Kitt Peak || Spacewatch || — || align=right | 2.9 km || 
|-id=155 bgcolor=#d6d6d6
| 320155 ||  || — || March 20, 2007 || Kitt Peak || Spacewatch || — || align=right | 3.3 km || 
|-id=156 bgcolor=#d6d6d6
| 320156 ||  || — || March 20, 2007 || Mount Lemmon || Mount Lemmon Survey || — || align=right | 2.4 km || 
|-id=157 bgcolor=#d6d6d6
| 320157 ||  || — || March 20, 2007 || Kitt Peak || Spacewatch || — || align=right | 2.8 km || 
|-id=158 bgcolor=#d6d6d6
| 320158 ||  || — || February 25, 2007 || Mount Lemmon || Mount Lemmon Survey || — || align=right | 3.2 km || 
|-id=159 bgcolor=#E9E9E9
| 320159 ||  || — || March 25, 2007 || Mount Lemmon || Mount Lemmon Survey || — || align=right | 2.3 km || 
|-id=160 bgcolor=#d6d6d6
| 320160 ||  || — || March 20, 2007 || Kitt Peak || Spacewatch || — || align=right | 5.3 km || 
|-id=161 bgcolor=#E9E9E9
| 320161 ||  || — || November 30, 2005 || Kitt Peak || Spacewatch || AST || align=right | 1.4 km || 
|-id=162 bgcolor=#d6d6d6
| 320162 ||  || — || April 7, 2007 || Mount Lemmon || Mount Lemmon Survey || — || align=right | 3.3 km || 
|-id=163 bgcolor=#d6d6d6
| 320163 ||  || — || April 7, 2007 || Mount Lemmon || Mount Lemmon Survey || THM || align=right | 2.5 km || 
|-id=164 bgcolor=#d6d6d6
| 320164 ||  || — || April 8, 2007 || Bergisch Gladbach || W. Bickel || HYG || align=right | 4.3 km || 
|-id=165 bgcolor=#d6d6d6
| 320165 ||  || — || February 23, 2007 || Mount Lemmon || Mount Lemmon Survey || — || align=right | 2.7 km || 
|-id=166 bgcolor=#d6d6d6
| 320166 ||  || — || April 7, 2007 || Mount Lemmon || Mount Lemmon Survey || — || align=right | 3.0 km || 
|-id=167 bgcolor=#d6d6d6
| 320167 ||  || — || April 11, 2007 || Altschwendt || W. Ries || — || align=right | 7.2 km || 
|-id=168 bgcolor=#d6d6d6
| 320168 ||  || — || April 12, 2007 || Bergisch Gladbac || W. Bickel || EOS || align=right | 2.0 km || 
|-id=169 bgcolor=#d6d6d6
| 320169 ||  || — || April 7, 2007 || Mount Lemmon || Mount Lemmon Survey || EOS || align=right | 2.4 km || 
|-id=170 bgcolor=#d6d6d6
| 320170 ||  || — || April 7, 2007 || Mount Lemmon || Mount Lemmon Survey || — || align=right | 3.0 km || 
|-id=171 bgcolor=#d6d6d6
| 320171 ||  || — || April 11, 2007 || Kitt Peak || Spacewatch || — || align=right | 4.2 km || 
|-id=172 bgcolor=#d6d6d6
| 320172 ||  || — || April 11, 2007 || Kitt Peak || Spacewatch || — || align=right | 2.6 km || 
|-id=173 bgcolor=#fefefe
| 320173 ||  || — || April 11, 2007 || Kitt Peak || Spacewatch || — || align=right | 1.2 km || 
|-id=174 bgcolor=#d6d6d6
| 320174 ||  || — || April 11, 2007 || Mount Lemmon || Mount Lemmon Survey || — || align=right | 3.8 km || 
|-id=175 bgcolor=#d6d6d6
| 320175 ||  || — || April 11, 2007 || Mount Lemmon || Mount Lemmon Survey || — || align=right | 2.9 km || 
|-id=176 bgcolor=#d6d6d6
| 320176 ||  || — || April 11, 2007 || Kitt Peak || Spacewatch || EOS || align=right | 2.0 km || 
|-id=177 bgcolor=#d6d6d6
| 320177 ||  || — || April 14, 2007 || Kitt Peak || Spacewatch || EOS || align=right | 2.7 km || 
|-id=178 bgcolor=#fefefe
| 320178 ||  || — || April 11, 2007 || Catalina || CSS || H || align=right | 1.1 km || 
|-id=179 bgcolor=#d6d6d6
| 320179 ||  || — || April 15, 2007 || Catalina || CSS || EOS || align=right | 2.7 km || 
|-id=180 bgcolor=#d6d6d6
| 320180 ||  || — || April 15, 2007 || Bergisch Gladbac || W. Bickel || — || align=right | 3.7 km || 
|-id=181 bgcolor=#d6d6d6
| 320181 ||  || — || April 15, 2007 || Mount Lemmon || Mount Lemmon Survey || — || align=right | 3.7 km || 
|-id=182 bgcolor=#d6d6d6
| 320182 ||  || — || April 15, 2007 || Mount Lemmon || Mount Lemmon Survey || — || align=right | 3.0 km || 
|-id=183 bgcolor=#d6d6d6
| 320183 ||  || — || March 11, 2007 || Kitt Peak || Spacewatch || URS || align=right | 4.4 km || 
|-id=184 bgcolor=#d6d6d6
| 320184 ||  || — || April 14, 2007 || Kitt Peak || Spacewatch || — || align=right | 3.7 km || 
|-id=185 bgcolor=#d6d6d6
| 320185 ||  || — || April 14, 2007 || Kitt Peak || Spacewatch || — || align=right | 4.1 km || 
|-id=186 bgcolor=#d6d6d6
| 320186 ||  || — || April 14, 2007 || Kitt Peak || Spacewatch || EOS || align=right | 2.7 km || 
|-id=187 bgcolor=#fefefe
| 320187 ||  || — || April 14, 2007 || Mount Lemmon || Mount Lemmon Survey || — || align=right | 1.0 km || 
|-id=188 bgcolor=#fefefe
| 320188 ||  || — || April 14, 2007 || Kitt Peak || Spacewatch || NYS || align=right data-sort-value="0.71" | 710 m || 
|-id=189 bgcolor=#d6d6d6
| 320189 ||  || — || April 15, 2007 || Kitt Peak || Spacewatch || LIX || align=right | 4.1 km || 
|-id=190 bgcolor=#d6d6d6
| 320190 ||  || — || April 10, 2007 || Antares || ARO || — || align=right | 2.7 km || 
|-id=191 bgcolor=#d6d6d6
| 320191 ||  || — || April 15, 2007 || Mount Lemmon || Mount Lemmon Survey || — || align=right | 3.1 km || 
|-id=192 bgcolor=#d6d6d6
| 320192 ||  || — || April 15, 2007 || Kitt Peak || Spacewatch || — || align=right | 3.7 km || 
|-id=193 bgcolor=#E9E9E9
| 320193 ||  || — || April 15, 2007 || Kitt Peak || Spacewatch || — || align=right | 1.4 km || 
|-id=194 bgcolor=#d6d6d6
| 320194 ||  || — || April 15, 2007 || Kitt Peak || Spacewatch || — || align=right | 2.9 km || 
|-id=195 bgcolor=#d6d6d6
| 320195 ||  || — || April 15, 2007 || Kitt Peak || Spacewatch || — || align=right | 2.9 km || 
|-id=196 bgcolor=#d6d6d6
| 320196 ||  || — || April 15, 2007 || Mount Lemmon || Mount Lemmon Survey || EOS || align=right | 2.0 km || 
|-id=197 bgcolor=#d6d6d6
| 320197 ||  || — || April 15, 2007 || Kitt Peak || Spacewatch || — || align=right | 3.7 km || 
|-id=198 bgcolor=#d6d6d6
| 320198 ||  || — || April 13, 2007 || Siding Spring || SSS || — || align=right | 3.4 km || 
|-id=199 bgcolor=#d6d6d6
| 320199 ||  || — || April 16, 2007 || Catalina || CSS || — || align=right | 3.4 km || 
|-id=200 bgcolor=#d6d6d6
| 320200 ||  || — || April 16, 2007 || Socorro || LINEAR || EOS || align=right | 3.2 km || 
|}

320201–320300 

|-bgcolor=#d6d6d6
| 320201 ||  || — || April 16, 2007 || Mount Lemmon || Mount Lemmon Survey || — || align=right | 3.8 km || 
|-id=202 bgcolor=#fefefe
| 320202 ||  || — || April 17, 2007 || Anderson Mesa || LONEOS || — || align=right data-sort-value="0.88" | 880 m || 
|-id=203 bgcolor=#d6d6d6
| 320203 ||  || — || April 18, 2007 || Mount Lemmon || Mount Lemmon Survey || VER || align=right | 2.7 km || 
|-id=204 bgcolor=#d6d6d6
| 320204 ||  || — || April 18, 2007 || Mount Lemmon || Mount Lemmon Survey || HYG || align=right | 2.9 km || 
|-id=205 bgcolor=#d6d6d6
| 320205 ||  || — || April 16, 2007 || Anderson Mesa || LONEOS || — || align=right | 4.6 km || 
|-id=206 bgcolor=#d6d6d6
| 320206 ||  || — || April 18, 2007 || Kitt Peak || Spacewatch || — || align=right | 3.9 km || 
|-id=207 bgcolor=#d6d6d6
| 320207 ||  || — || April 16, 2007 || Catalina || CSS || — || align=right | 4.2 km || 
|-id=208 bgcolor=#d6d6d6
| 320208 ||  || — || April 18, 2007 || Mount Lemmon || Mount Lemmon Survey || — || align=right | 2.1 km || 
|-id=209 bgcolor=#d6d6d6
| 320209 ||  || — || April 18, 2007 || Kitt Peak || Spacewatch || — || align=right | 2.9 km || 
|-id=210 bgcolor=#d6d6d6
| 320210 ||  || — || April 18, 2007 || Purple Mountain || PMO NEO || EOS || align=right | 3.0 km || 
|-id=211 bgcolor=#d6d6d6
| 320211 ||  || — || April 19, 2007 || Mount Lemmon || Mount Lemmon Survey || — || align=right | 3.4 km || 
|-id=212 bgcolor=#d6d6d6
| 320212 ||  || — || April 19, 2007 || Mount Lemmon || Mount Lemmon Survey || — || align=right | 2.4 km || 
|-id=213 bgcolor=#E9E9E9
| 320213 ||  || — || April 19, 2007 || Kitt Peak || Spacewatch || AGN || align=right | 1.3 km || 
|-id=214 bgcolor=#d6d6d6
| 320214 ||  || — || April 20, 2007 || Kitt Peak || Spacewatch || HYG || align=right | 3.1 km || 
|-id=215 bgcolor=#fefefe
| 320215 ||  || — || April 20, 2007 || Kitt Peak || Spacewatch || SUL || align=right | 2.4 km || 
|-id=216 bgcolor=#d6d6d6
| 320216 ||  || — || April 23, 2007 || Tiki || S. F. Hönig, N. Teamo || — || align=right | 3.0 km || 
|-id=217 bgcolor=#d6d6d6
| 320217 ||  || — || April 18, 2007 || Catalina || CSS || TIR || align=right | 3.9 km || 
|-id=218 bgcolor=#d6d6d6
| 320218 ||  || — || April 18, 2007 || Kitt Peak || Spacewatch || — || align=right | 2.9 km || 
|-id=219 bgcolor=#fefefe
| 320219 ||  || — || April 22, 2007 || Kitt Peak || Spacewatch || ERI || align=right | 2.1 km || 
|-id=220 bgcolor=#d6d6d6
| 320220 ||  || — || April 18, 2007 || Mount Lemmon || Mount Lemmon Survey || — || align=right | 2.7 km || 
|-id=221 bgcolor=#d6d6d6
| 320221 ||  || — || April 22, 2007 || Catalina || CSS || — || align=right | 3.1 km || 
|-id=222 bgcolor=#d6d6d6
| 320222 ||  || — || April 22, 2007 || Kitt Peak || Spacewatch || — || align=right | 4.1 km || 
|-id=223 bgcolor=#d6d6d6
| 320223 ||  || — || April 22, 2007 || Kitt Peak || Spacewatch || EOS || align=right | 3.3 km || 
|-id=224 bgcolor=#d6d6d6
| 320224 ||  || — || April 22, 2007 || Kitt Peak || Spacewatch || — || align=right | 3.0 km || 
|-id=225 bgcolor=#d6d6d6
| 320225 ||  || — || April 25, 2007 || Mount Lemmon || Mount Lemmon Survey || — || align=right | 4.0 km || 
|-id=226 bgcolor=#d6d6d6
| 320226 ||  || — || April 18, 2007 || Mount Lemmon || Mount Lemmon Survey || THM || align=right | 2.6 km || 
|-id=227 bgcolor=#d6d6d6
| 320227 ||  || — || April 22, 2007 || Catalina || CSS || — || align=right | 4.0 km || 
|-id=228 bgcolor=#d6d6d6
| 320228 ||  || — || May 6, 2007 || Kitt Peak || Spacewatch || — || align=right | 3.2 km || 
|-id=229 bgcolor=#fefefe
| 320229 ||  || — || May 9, 2007 || Mount Lemmon || Mount Lemmon Survey || — || align=right data-sort-value="0.96" | 960 m || 
|-id=230 bgcolor=#fefefe
| 320230 ||  || — || May 9, 2007 || Mount Lemmon || Mount Lemmon Survey || — || align=right data-sort-value="0.93" | 930 m || 
|-id=231 bgcolor=#d6d6d6
| 320231 ||  || — || April 19, 2007 || Kitt Peak || Spacewatch || — || align=right | 2.5 km || 
|-id=232 bgcolor=#d6d6d6
| 320232 ||  || — || May 10, 2007 || Mount Lemmon || Mount Lemmon Survey || — || align=right | 2.7 km || 
|-id=233 bgcolor=#E9E9E9
| 320233 ||  || — || May 7, 2007 || Kitt Peak || Spacewatch || — || align=right | 2.1 km || 
|-id=234 bgcolor=#d6d6d6
| 320234 ||  || — || May 10, 2007 || Mount Lemmon || Mount Lemmon Survey || HYG || align=right | 4.0 km || 
|-id=235 bgcolor=#d6d6d6
| 320235 ||  || — || May 10, 2007 || Desert Moon || B. L. Stevens || — || align=right | 3.9 km || 
|-id=236 bgcolor=#d6d6d6
| 320236 ||  || — || May 7, 2007 || Kitt Peak || Spacewatch || — || align=right | 4.1 km || 
|-id=237 bgcolor=#E9E9E9
| 320237 ||  || — || May 9, 2007 || Kitt Peak || Spacewatch || — || align=right | 3.1 km || 
|-id=238 bgcolor=#d6d6d6
| 320238 ||  || — || May 10, 2007 || Kitt Peak || Spacewatch || — || align=right | 3.1 km || 
|-id=239 bgcolor=#d6d6d6
| 320239 ||  || — || May 12, 2007 || Kitt Peak || Spacewatch || EOS || align=right | 3.1 km || 
|-id=240 bgcolor=#E9E9E9
| 320240 ||  || — || May 12, 2007 || Mount Lemmon || Mount Lemmon Survey || — || align=right | 3.9 km || 
|-id=241 bgcolor=#d6d6d6
| 320241 ||  || — || May 13, 2007 || Siding Spring || SSS || EUP || align=right | 5.4 km || 
|-id=242 bgcolor=#d6d6d6
| 320242 ||  || — || May 8, 2007 || Catalina || CSS || EUP || align=right | 3.5 km || 
|-id=243 bgcolor=#d6d6d6
| 320243 ||  || — || May 11, 2007 || Kitt Peak || Spacewatch || — || align=right | 4.7 km || 
|-id=244 bgcolor=#d6d6d6
| 320244 ||  || — || May 17, 2007 || Kitt Peak || Spacewatch || — || align=right | 2.6 km || 
|-id=245 bgcolor=#fefefe
| 320245 ||  || — || May 22, 2007 || Tiki || S. F. Hönig, N. Teamo || V || align=right data-sort-value="0.80" | 800 m || 
|-id=246 bgcolor=#fefefe
| 320246 ||  || — || May 16, 2007 || Siding Spring || SSS || — || align=right | 1.1 km || 
|-id=247 bgcolor=#E9E9E9
| 320247 ||  || — || June 8, 2007 || Kitt Peak || Spacewatch || — || align=right | 1.3 km || 
|-id=248 bgcolor=#d6d6d6
| 320248 ||  || — || June 9, 2007 || Kitt Peak || Spacewatch || — || align=right | 4.1 km || 
|-id=249 bgcolor=#d6d6d6
| 320249 ||  || — || June 10, 2007 || Kitt Peak || Spacewatch || — || align=right | 4.7 km || 
|-id=250 bgcolor=#d6d6d6
| 320250 ||  || — || June 16, 2007 || Kitt Peak || Spacewatch || — || align=right | 3.1 km || 
|-id=251 bgcolor=#E9E9E9
| 320251 ||  || — || June 21, 2007 || Socorro || LINEAR || — || align=right | 3.3 km || 
|-id=252 bgcolor=#d6d6d6
| 320252 ||  || — || June 22, 2007 || Kitt Peak || Spacewatch || TIR || align=right | 3.0 km || 
|-id=253 bgcolor=#E9E9E9
| 320253 || 2007 OF || — || July 16, 2007 || La Sagra || OAM Obs. || — || align=right | 4.3 km || 
|-id=254 bgcolor=#E9E9E9
| 320254 ||  || — || August 8, 2007 || Siding Spring || SSS || — || align=right | 2.9 km || 
|-id=255 bgcolor=#E9E9E9
| 320255 ||  || — || August 5, 2007 || Socorro || LINEAR || — || align=right | 2.2 km || 
|-id=256 bgcolor=#fefefe
| 320256 ||  || — || August 12, 2007 || Socorro || LINEAR || — || align=right | 1.0 km || 
|-id=257 bgcolor=#d6d6d6
| 320257 ||  || — || August 12, 2007 || Bergisch Gladbac || W. Bickel || THM || align=right | 2.6 km || 
|-id=258 bgcolor=#fefefe
| 320258 ||  || — || August 14, 2007 || Altschwendt || W. Ries || — || align=right data-sort-value="0.72" | 720 m || 
|-id=259 bgcolor=#E9E9E9
| 320259 ||  || — || August 9, 2007 || Kitt Peak || Spacewatch || MRX || align=right | 1.4 km || 
|-id=260 bgcolor=#E9E9E9
| 320260 Bertout ||  ||  || August 31, 2007 || Siding Spring || L. Kiss, K. Sárneczky || — || align=right | 2.0 km || 
|-id=261 bgcolor=#d6d6d6
| 320261 ||  || — || August 22, 2007 || Socorro || LINEAR || — || align=right | 5.0 km || 
|-id=262 bgcolor=#E9E9E9
| 320262 ||  || — || September 1, 2007 || Eskridge || G. Hug || — || align=right | 2.8 km || 
|-id=263 bgcolor=#d6d6d6
| 320263 ||  || — || September 3, 2007 || Catalina || CSS || — || align=right | 3.9 km || 
|-id=264 bgcolor=#fefefe
| 320264 ||  || — || September 6, 2007 || Dauban || Chante-Perdrix Obs. || FLO || align=right | 1.1 km || 
|-id=265 bgcolor=#fefefe
| 320265 ||  || — || September 6, 2007 || Dauban || Chante-Perdrix Obs. || MAS || align=right data-sort-value="0.90" | 900 m || 
|-id=266 bgcolor=#E9E9E9
| 320266 ||  || — || September 4, 2007 || Catalina || CSS || — || align=right | 1.2 km || 
|-id=267 bgcolor=#d6d6d6
| 320267 ||  || — || September 13, 2007 || Mount Lemmon || Mount Lemmon Survey || — || align=right | 4.5 km || 
|-id=268 bgcolor=#E9E9E9
| 320268 ||  || — || September 3, 2007 || Catalina || CSS || — || align=right | 3.4 km || 
|-id=269 bgcolor=#fefefe
| 320269 ||  || — || September 4, 2007 || Catalina || CSS || — || align=right data-sort-value="0.94" | 940 m || 
|-id=270 bgcolor=#fefefe
| 320270 ||  || — || September 9, 2007 || Kitt Peak || Spacewatch || — || align=right data-sort-value="0.93" | 930 m || 
|-id=271 bgcolor=#d6d6d6
| 320271 ||  || — || September 10, 2007 || Mount Lemmon || Mount Lemmon Survey || THM || align=right | 2.8 km || 
|-id=272 bgcolor=#d6d6d6
| 320272 ||  || — || September 10, 2007 || Mount Lemmon || Mount Lemmon Survey || — || align=right | 2.9 km || 
|-id=273 bgcolor=#fefefe
| 320273 ||  || — || September 10, 2007 || Kitt Peak || Spacewatch || — || align=right data-sort-value="0.68" | 680 m || 
|-id=274 bgcolor=#d6d6d6
| 320274 ||  || — || September 10, 2007 || Kitt Peak || Spacewatch || — || align=right | 3.3 km || 
|-id=275 bgcolor=#d6d6d6
| 320275 ||  || — || September 10, 2007 || Mount Lemmon || Mount Lemmon Survey || — || align=right | 2.9 km || 
|-id=276 bgcolor=#FA8072
| 320276 ||  || — || September 10, 2007 || Mount Lemmon || Mount Lemmon Survey || — || align=right data-sort-value="0.65" | 650 m || 
|-id=277 bgcolor=#E9E9E9
| 320277 ||  || — || September 11, 2007 || Mount Lemmon || Mount Lemmon Survey || — || align=right | 1.5 km || 
|-id=278 bgcolor=#fefefe
| 320278 ||  || — || September 11, 2007 || Catalina || CSS || NYS || align=right data-sort-value="0.74" | 740 m || 
|-id=279 bgcolor=#d6d6d6
| 320279 ||  || — || September 12, 2007 || Mount Lemmon || Mount Lemmon Survey || — || align=right | 3.4 km || 
|-id=280 bgcolor=#fefefe
| 320280 ||  || — || September 14, 2007 || Socorro || LINEAR || FLO || align=right data-sort-value="0.71" | 710 m || 
|-id=281 bgcolor=#E9E9E9
| 320281 ||  || — || September 11, 2007 || Purple Mountain || PMO NEO || AGN || align=right | 1.7 km || 
|-id=282 bgcolor=#d6d6d6
| 320282 ||  || — || September 10, 2007 || Kitt Peak || Spacewatch || — || align=right | 3.2 km || 
|-id=283 bgcolor=#d6d6d6
| 320283 ||  || — || September 10, 2007 || Kitt Peak || Spacewatch || HYG || align=right | 3.2 km || 
|-id=284 bgcolor=#fefefe
| 320284 ||  || — || September 12, 2007 || Catalina || CSS || — || align=right data-sort-value="0.98" | 980 m || 
|-id=285 bgcolor=#E9E9E9
| 320285 ||  || — || September 13, 2007 || Mount Lemmon || Mount Lemmon Survey || — || align=right | 2.9 km || 
|-id=286 bgcolor=#C2FFFF
| 320286 ||  || — || September 10, 2007 || Kitt Peak || Spacewatch || L4 || align=right | 7.3 km || 
|-id=287 bgcolor=#E9E9E9
| 320287 ||  || — || September 11, 2007 || Kitt Peak || Spacewatch || AST || align=right | 1.7 km || 
|-id=288 bgcolor=#E9E9E9
| 320288 ||  || — || September 12, 2007 || Anderson Mesa || LONEOS || — || align=right | 2.9 km || 
|-id=289 bgcolor=#E9E9E9
| 320289 ||  || — || October 17, 2003 || Kitt Peak || Spacewatch || — || align=right | 2.1 km || 
|-id=290 bgcolor=#d6d6d6
| 320290 ||  || — || September 9, 2007 || Kitt Peak || Spacewatch || — || align=right | 4.0 km || 
|-id=291 bgcolor=#fefefe
| 320291 ||  || — || September 13, 2007 || Anderson Mesa || LONEOS || — || align=right data-sort-value="0.97" | 970 m || 
|-id=292 bgcolor=#E9E9E9
| 320292 ||  || — || September 14, 2007 || Mount Lemmon || Mount Lemmon Survey || AGNfast? || align=right | 1.4 km || 
|-id=293 bgcolor=#fefefe
| 320293 ||  || — || September 4, 2007 || Catalina || CSS || FLO || align=right data-sort-value="0.91" | 910 m || 
|-id=294 bgcolor=#E9E9E9
| 320294 ||  || — || September 10, 2007 || Kitt Peak || Spacewatch || — || align=right | 1.0 km || 
|-id=295 bgcolor=#fefefe
| 320295 ||  || — || September 14, 2007 || Socorro || LINEAR || FLO || align=right data-sort-value="0.76" | 760 m || 
|-id=296 bgcolor=#d6d6d6
| 320296 ||  || — || September 12, 2007 || Catalina || CSS || — || align=right | 4.2 km || 
|-id=297 bgcolor=#fefefe
| 320297 ||  || — || September 13, 2007 || Mount Lemmon || Mount Lemmon Survey || — || align=right data-sort-value="0.75" | 750 m || 
|-id=298 bgcolor=#fefefe
| 320298 ||  || — || September 14, 2007 || Kitt Peak || Spacewatch || — || align=right data-sort-value="0.69" | 690 m || 
|-id=299 bgcolor=#fefefe
| 320299 ||  || — || September 15, 2007 || Kitt Peak || Spacewatch || — || align=right data-sort-value="0.78" | 780 m || 
|-id=300 bgcolor=#E9E9E9
| 320300 ||  || — || September 14, 2007 || Kitt Peak || Spacewatch || — || align=right | 2.0 km || 
|}

320301–320400 

|-bgcolor=#fefefe
| 320301 ||  || — || September 15, 2007 || Mount Lemmon || Mount Lemmon Survey || — || align=right | 1.0 km || 
|-id=302 bgcolor=#C2FFFF
| 320302 ||  || — || September 13, 2007 || Mount Lemmon || Mount Lemmon Survey || L4 || align=right | 12 km || 
|-id=303 bgcolor=#d6d6d6
| 320303 ||  || — || September 13, 2007 || Socorro || LINEAR || THM || align=right | 3.1 km || 
|-id=304 bgcolor=#d6d6d6
| 320304 ||  || — || September 13, 2007 || Mount Lemmon || Mount Lemmon Survey || — || align=right | 4.0 km || 
|-id=305 bgcolor=#E9E9E9
| 320305 ||  || — || September 13, 2007 || Mount Lemmon || Mount Lemmon Survey || — || align=right | 1.8 km || 
|-id=306 bgcolor=#fefefe
| 320306 ||  || — || September 16, 2007 || Lulin Observatory || LUSS || — || align=right | 1.1 km || 
|-id=307 bgcolor=#E9E9E9
| 320307 ||  || — || September 16, 2007 || Socorro || LINEAR || — || align=right | 1.5 km || 
|-id=308 bgcolor=#fefefe
| 320308 ||  || — || September 20, 2007 || Catalina || CSS || NYS || align=right data-sort-value="0.73" | 730 m || 
|-id=309 bgcolor=#d6d6d6
| 320309 ||  || — || September 18, 2007 || Catalina || CSS || EOS || align=right | 3.9 km || 
|-id=310 bgcolor=#fefefe
| 320310 ||  || — || September 25, 2007 || Mount Lemmon || Mount Lemmon Survey || — || align=right data-sort-value="0.92" | 920 m || 
|-id=311 bgcolor=#E9E9E9
| 320311 || 2007 TT || — || October 3, 2007 || 7300 Observatory || W. K. Y. Yeung || — || align=right | 1.6 km || 
|-id=312 bgcolor=#fefefe
| 320312 ||  || — || October 4, 2007 || Mount Lemmon || Mount Lemmon Survey || — || align=right data-sort-value="0.83" | 830 m || 
|-id=313 bgcolor=#d6d6d6
| 320313 ||  || — || October 4, 2007 || Kitt Peak || Spacewatch || — || align=right | 2.8 km || 
|-id=314 bgcolor=#fefefe
| 320314 ||  || — || October 7, 2007 || Dauban || Chante-Perdrix Obs. || — || align=right | 1.2 km || 
|-id=315 bgcolor=#fefefe
| 320315 ||  || — || October 6, 2007 || Socorro || LINEAR || MAS || align=right | 1.0 km || 
|-id=316 bgcolor=#fefefe
| 320316 ||  || — || October 8, 2007 || Socorro || LINEAR || NYS || align=right data-sort-value="0.87" | 870 m || 
|-id=317 bgcolor=#fefefe
| 320317 ||  || — || October 4, 2007 || Kitt Peak || Spacewatch || — || align=right | 1.0 km || 
|-id=318 bgcolor=#fefefe
| 320318 ||  || — || October 7, 2007 || Catalina || CSS || — || align=right | 1.0 km || 
|-id=319 bgcolor=#fefefe
| 320319 ||  || — || October 10, 2007 || Nashville || R. Clingan || — || align=right data-sort-value="0.77" | 770 m || 
|-id=320 bgcolor=#fefefe
| 320320 ||  || — || October 4, 2007 || Kitt Peak || Spacewatch || — || align=right data-sort-value="0.79" | 790 m || 
|-id=321 bgcolor=#fefefe
| 320321 ||  || — || October 4, 2007 || Kitt Peak || Spacewatch || — || align=right data-sort-value="0.87" | 870 m || 
|-id=322 bgcolor=#E9E9E9
| 320322 ||  || — || October 5, 2007 || Kitt Peak || Spacewatch || — || align=right | 1.0 km || 
|-id=323 bgcolor=#E9E9E9
| 320323 ||  || — || October 4, 2007 || Catalina || CSS || — || align=right | 1.3 km || 
|-id=324 bgcolor=#fefefe
| 320324 ||  || — || October 7, 2007 || Catalina || CSS || FLO || align=right data-sort-value="0.83" | 830 m || 
|-id=325 bgcolor=#E9E9E9
| 320325 ||  || — || October 4, 2007 || Kitt Peak || Spacewatch || — || align=right | 3.4 km || 
|-id=326 bgcolor=#fefefe
| 320326 ||  || — || October 4, 2007 || Kitt Peak || Spacewatch || — || align=right data-sort-value="0.74" | 740 m || 
|-id=327 bgcolor=#d6d6d6
| 320327 ||  || — || October 7, 2007 || Mount Lemmon || Mount Lemmon Survey || KOR || align=right | 1.6 km || 
|-id=328 bgcolor=#fefefe
| 320328 ||  || — || October 7, 2007 || Mount Lemmon || Mount Lemmon Survey || NYS || align=right data-sort-value="0.82" | 820 m || 
|-id=329 bgcolor=#fefefe
| 320329 ||  || — || October 4, 2007 || Kitt Peak || Spacewatch || — || align=right data-sort-value="0.80" | 800 m || 
|-id=330 bgcolor=#fefefe
| 320330 ||  || — || October 5, 2007 || Purple Mountain || PMO NEO || FLO || align=right data-sort-value="0.80" | 800 m || 
|-id=331 bgcolor=#fefefe
| 320331 ||  || — || October 7, 2007 || Catalina || CSS || — || align=right data-sort-value="0.81" | 810 m || 
|-id=332 bgcolor=#fefefe
| 320332 ||  || — || October 8, 2007 || Purple Mountain || PMO NEO || — || align=right | 1.0 km || 
|-id=333 bgcolor=#d6d6d6
| 320333 ||  || — || October 6, 2007 || Kitt Peak || Spacewatch || KAR || align=right | 1.1 km || 
|-id=334 bgcolor=#E9E9E9
| 320334 ||  || — || October 6, 2007 || Kitt Peak || Spacewatch || — || align=right | 3.5 km || 
|-id=335 bgcolor=#fefefe
| 320335 ||  || — || October 6, 2007 || Kitt Peak || Spacewatch || — || align=right data-sort-value="0.84" | 840 m || 
|-id=336 bgcolor=#d6d6d6
| 320336 ||  || — || October 6, 2007 || Kitt Peak || Spacewatch || KOR || align=right | 1.3 km || 
|-id=337 bgcolor=#d6d6d6
| 320337 ||  || — || October 7, 2007 || Mount Lemmon || Mount Lemmon Survey || — || align=right | 2.8 km || 
|-id=338 bgcolor=#fefefe
| 320338 ||  || — || October 9, 2007 || Kitt Peak || Spacewatch || NYS || align=right data-sort-value="0.57" | 570 m || 
|-id=339 bgcolor=#fefefe
| 320339 ||  || — || October 6, 2007 || Socorro || LINEAR || — || align=right data-sort-value="0.77" | 770 m || 
|-id=340 bgcolor=#fefefe
| 320340 ||  || — || October 6, 2007 || Socorro || LINEAR || — || align=right data-sort-value="0.79" | 790 m || 
|-id=341 bgcolor=#d6d6d6
| 320341 ||  || — || October 9, 2007 || Socorro || LINEAR || — || align=right | 3.3 km || 
|-id=342 bgcolor=#fefefe
| 320342 ||  || — || October 9, 2007 || Socorro || LINEAR || — || align=right data-sort-value="0.80" | 800 m || 
|-id=343 bgcolor=#fefefe
| 320343 ||  || — || October 9, 2007 || Socorro || LINEAR || — || align=right data-sort-value="0.98" | 980 m || 
|-id=344 bgcolor=#fefefe
| 320344 ||  || — || October 12, 2007 || Socorro || LINEAR || — || align=right | 1.1 km || 
|-id=345 bgcolor=#fefefe
| 320345 ||  || — || October 12, 2007 || Dauban || Chante-Perdrix Obs. || — || align=right | 1.1 km || 
|-id=346 bgcolor=#E9E9E9
| 320346 ||  || — || October 8, 2007 || Kitt Peak || Spacewatch || — || align=right | 1.7 km || 
|-id=347 bgcolor=#fefefe
| 320347 ||  || — || October 11, 2007 || Lulin Observatory || Q.-z. Ye || — || align=right data-sort-value="0.79" | 790 m || 
|-id=348 bgcolor=#fefefe
| 320348 ||  || — || October 9, 2007 || Purple Mountain || PMO NEO || — || align=right | 1.2 km || 
|-id=349 bgcolor=#d6d6d6
| 320349 ||  || — || October 13, 2007 || Socorro || LINEAR || — || align=right | 3.5 km || 
|-id=350 bgcolor=#fefefe
| 320350 ||  || — || October 15, 2007 || Socorro || LINEAR || — || align=right data-sort-value="0.84" | 840 m || 
|-id=351 bgcolor=#fefefe
| 320351 ||  || — || October 5, 2007 || Kitt Peak || Spacewatch || — || align=right data-sort-value="0.75" | 750 m || 
|-id=352 bgcolor=#E9E9E9
| 320352 ||  || — || October 8, 2007 || Mount Lemmon || Mount Lemmon Survey || — || align=right | 1.9 km || 
|-id=353 bgcolor=#fefefe
| 320353 ||  || — || October 8, 2007 || Mount Lemmon || Mount Lemmon Survey || NYS || align=right data-sort-value="0.64" | 640 m || 
|-id=354 bgcolor=#fefefe
| 320354 ||  || — || October 6, 2007 || Kitt Peak || Spacewatch || FLO || align=right data-sort-value="0.76" | 760 m || 
|-id=355 bgcolor=#E9E9E9
| 320355 ||  || — || October 7, 2007 || Kitt Peak || Spacewatch || — || align=right | 1.9 km || 
|-id=356 bgcolor=#E9E9E9
| 320356 ||  || — || October 7, 2007 || Kitt Peak || Spacewatch || AGN || align=right | 1.6 km || 
|-id=357 bgcolor=#fefefe
| 320357 ||  || — || October 8, 2007 || Kitt Peak || Spacewatch || — || align=right data-sort-value="0.73" | 730 m || 
|-id=358 bgcolor=#E9E9E9
| 320358 ||  || — || October 8, 2007 || Kitt Peak || Spacewatch || — || align=right data-sort-value="0.93" | 930 m || 
|-id=359 bgcolor=#E9E9E9
| 320359 ||  || — || October 8, 2007 || Kitt Peak || Spacewatch || HEN || align=right | 1.2 km || 
|-id=360 bgcolor=#E9E9E9
| 320360 ||  || — || October 8, 2007 || Kitt Peak || Spacewatch || — || align=right | 2.4 km || 
|-id=361 bgcolor=#fefefe
| 320361 ||  || — || October 9, 2007 || Mount Lemmon || Mount Lemmon Survey || V || align=right data-sort-value="0.64" | 640 m || 
|-id=362 bgcolor=#fefefe
| 320362 ||  || — || October 7, 2007 || Mount Lemmon || Mount Lemmon Survey || FLO || align=right data-sort-value="0.63" | 630 m || 
|-id=363 bgcolor=#fefefe
| 320363 ||  || — || October 10, 2007 || Kitt Peak || Spacewatch || — || align=right data-sort-value="0.83" | 830 m || 
|-id=364 bgcolor=#fefefe
| 320364 ||  || — || November 10, 2004 || Kitt Peak || Spacewatch || — || align=right data-sort-value="0.85" | 850 m || 
|-id=365 bgcolor=#fefefe
| 320365 ||  || — || October 10, 2007 || Mount Lemmon || Mount Lemmon Survey || — || align=right data-sort-value="0.67" | 670 m || 
|-id=366 bgcolor=#fefefe
| 320366 ||  || — || October 10, 2007 || Catalina || CSS || — || align=right | 1.1 km || 
|-id=367 bgcolor=#d6d6d6
| 320367 ||  || — || October 14, 2007 || Mount Lemmon || Mount Lemmon Survey || — || align=right | 3.5 km || 
|-id=368 bgcolor=#fefefe
| 320368 ||  || — || October 10, 2007 || Catalina || CSS || FLO || align=right data-sort-value="0.77" | 770 m || 
|-id=369 bgcolor=#fefefe
| 320369 ||  || — || October 15, 2007 || Kitt Peak || Spacewatch || FLO || align=right data-sort-value="0.68" | 680 m || 
|-id=370 bgcolor=#E9E9E9
| 320370 ||  || — || October 14, 2007 || Catalina || CSS || — || align=right | 3.7 km || 
|-id=371 bgcolor=#d6d6d6
| 320371 ||  || — || October 15, 2007 || Catalina || CSS || EOS || align=right | 3.0 km || 
|-id=372 bgcolor=#d6d6d6
| 320372 ||  || — || October 10, 2007 || Catalina || CSS || EOS || align=right | 2.8 km || 
|-id=373 bgcolor=#d6d6d6
| 320373 ||  || — || October 5, 2007 || Siding Spring || SSS || — || align=right | 4.8 km || 
|-id=374 bgcolor=#fefefe
| 320374 ||  || — || October 11, 2007 || Lulin || LUSS || — || align=right | 1.0 km || 
|-id=375 bgcolor=#E9E9E9
| 320375 ||  || — || October 9, 2007 || Mount Lemmon || Mount Lemmon Survey || MRX || align=right | 1.4 km || 
|-id=376 bgcolor=#d6d6d6
| 320376 ||  || — || October 12, 2007 || Kitt Peak || Spacewatch || — || align=right | 5.5 km || 
|-id=377 bgcolor=#fefefe
| 320377 || 2007 UP || — || October 16, 2007 || Vallemare di Borbona || V. S. Casulli || FLO || align=right data-sort-value="0.67" | 670 m || 
|-id=378 bgcolor=#FFC2E0
| 320378 ||  || — || October 19, 2007 || Kitt Peak || Spacewatch || AMOcritical || align=right data-sort-value="0.20" | 200 m || 
|-id=379 bgcolor=#d6d6d6
| 320379 ||  || — || October 18, 2007 || Socorro || LINEAR || — || align=right | 4.1 km || 
|-id=380 bgcolor=#E9E9E9
| 320380 ||  || — || October 17, 2007 || Dauban || Chante-Perdrix Obs. || — || align=right | 3.3 km || 
|-id=381 bgcolor=#fefefe
| 320381 ||  || — || October 18, 2007 || Anderson Mesa || LONEOS || NYS || align=right data-sort-value="0.62" | 620 m || 
|-id=382 bgcolor=#fefefe
| 320382 ||  || — || October 19, 2007 || Socorro || LINEAR || FLO || align=right data-sort-value="0.93" | 930 m || 
|-id=383 bgcolor=#E9E9E9
| 320383 ||  || — || October 17, 2007 || Anderson Mesa || LONEOS || DOR || align=right | 3.1 km || 
|-id=384 bgcolor=#d6d6d6
| 320384 ||  || — || October 16, 2007 || Kitt Peak || Spacewatch || KOR || align=right | 1.6 km || 
|-id=385 bgcolor=#fefefe
| 320385 ||  || — || October 19, 2007 || Kitt Peak || Spacewatch || — || align=right data-sort-value="0.98" | 980 m || 
|-id=386 bgcolor=#fefefe
| 320386 ||  || — || October 19, 2007 || Catalina || CSS || — || align=right | 1.2 km || 
|-id=387 bgcolor=#fefefe
| 320387 ||  || — || October 16, 2007 || Kitt Peak || Spacewatch || — || align=right data-sort-value="0.60" | 600 m || 
|-id=388 bgcolor=#E9E9E9
| 320388 ||  || — || March 9, 2005 || Mount Lemmon || Mount Lemmon Survey || AGN || align=right | 1.2 km || 
|-id=389 bgcolor=#d6d6d6
| 320389 ||  || — || October 17, 2007 || Mount Lemmon || Mount Lemmon Survey || — || align=right | 2.9 km || 
|-id=390 bgcolor=#d6d6d6
| 320390 ||  || — || October 20, 2007 || Mount Lemmon || Mount Lemmon Survey || — || align=right | 3.0 km || 
|-id=391 bgcolor=#fefefe
| 320391 ||  || — || October 25, 2007 || Mount Lemmon || Mount Lemmon Survey || — || align=right data-sort-value="0.76" | 760 m || 
|-id=392 bgcolor=#fefefe
| 320392 ||  || — || October 30, 2007 || Mount Lemmon || Mount Lemmon Survey || — || align=right data-sort-value="0.82" | 820 m || 
|-id=393 bgcolor=#d6d6d6
| 320393 ||  || — || October 31, 2007 || Kitt Peak || Spacewatch || — || align=right | 2.9 km || 
|-id=394 bgcolor=#E9E9E9
| 320394 ||  || — || October 30, 2007 || Mount Lemmon || Mount Lemmon Survey || AST || align=right | 2.1 km || 
|-id=395 bgcolor=#fefefe
| 320395 ||  || — || October 31, 2007 || Mount Lemmon || Mount Lemmon Survey || MAS || align=right data-sort-value="0.80" | 800 m || 
|-id=396 bgcolor=#fefefe
| 320396 ||  || — || October 31, 2007 || Mount Lemmon || Mount Lemmon Survey || NYS || align=right data-sort-value="0.58" | 580 m || 
|-id=397 bgcolor=#fefefe
| 320397 ||  || — || October 30, 2007 || Kitt Peak || Spacewatch || — || align=right | 1.6 km || 
|-id=398 bgcolor=#d6d6d6
| 320398 ||  || — || October 30, 2007 || Kitt Peak || Spacewatch || CRO || align=right | 5.3 km || 
|-id=399 bgcolor=#d6d6d6
| 320399 ||  || — || October 30, 2007 || Kitt Peak || Spacewatch || — || align=right | 4.6 km || 
|-id=400 bgcolor=#d6d6d6
| 320400 ||  || — || October 30, 2007 || Kitt Peak || Spacewatch || KOR || align=right | 1.5 km || 
|}

320401–320500 

|-bgcolor=#d6d6d6
| 320401 ||  || — || October 30, 2007 || Kitt Peak || Spacewatch || — || align=right | 3.0 km || 
|-id=402 bgcolor=#d6d6d6
| 320402 ||  || — || October 30, 2007 || Mount Lemmon || Mount Lemmon Survey || CHA || align=right | 2.5 km || 
|-id=403 bgcolor=#fefefe
| 320403 ||  || — || October 31, 2007 || Kitt Peak || Spacewatch || — || align=right data-sort-value="0.70" | 700 m || 
|-id=404 bgcolor=#fefefe
| 320404 ||  || — || October 30, 2007 || Catalina || CSS || — || align=right data-sort-value="0.77" | 770 m || 
|-id=405 bgcolor=#d6d6d6
| 320405 ||  || — || October 30, 2007 || Kitt Peak || Spacewatch || KOR || align=right | 1.5 km || 
|-id=406 bgcolor=#d6d6d6
| 320406 ||  || — || October 20, 2007 || Catalina || CSS || URS || align=right | 5.2 km || 
|-id=407 bgcolor=#fefefe
| 320407 ||  || — || October 20, 2007 || Mount Lemmon || Mount Lemmon Survey || — || align=right data-sort-value="0.78" | 780 m || 
|-id=408 bgcolor=#fefefe
| 320408 ||  || — || December 17, 2001 || Kitt Peak || Spacewatch || — || align=right | 1.1 km || 
|-id=409 bgcolor=#fefefe
| 320409 ||  || — || October 16, 2007 || Mount Lemmon || Mount Lemmon Survey || NYS || align=right data-sort-value="0.64" | 640 m || 
|-id=410 bgcolor=#E9E9E9
| 320410 ||  || — || November 1, 2007 || 7300 || W. K. Y. Yeung || WIT || align=right | 1.2 km || 
|-id=411 bgcolor=#fefefe
| 320411 ||  || — || November 2, 2007 || CBA-NOVAC || D. R. Skillman || V || align=right data-sort-value="0.85" | 850 m || 
|-id=412 bgcolor=#fefefe
| 320412 ||  || — || November 2, 2007 || Socorro || LINEAR || V || align=right data-sort-value="0.69" | 690 m || 
|-id=413 bgcolor=#fefefe
| 320413 ||  || — || November 1, 2007 || Kitt Peak || Spacewatch || — || align=right data-sort-value="0.97" | 970 m || 
|-id=414 bgcolor=#d6d6d6
| 320414 ||  || — || November 2, 2007 || La Cañada || J. Lacruz || EOS || align=right | 2.2 km || 
|-id=415 bgcolor=#fefefe
| 320415 ||  || — || November 6, 2007 || Mayhill || A. Lowe || — || align=right | 1.2 km || 
|-id=416 bgcolor=#fefefe
| 320416 ||  || — || November 1, 2007 || Kitt Peak || Spacewatch || — || align=right | 1.1 km || 
|-id=417 bgcolor=#d6d6d6
| 320417 ||  || — || November 2, 2007 || Kitt Peak || Spacewatch || — || align=right | 4.2 km || 
|-id=418 bgcolor=#fefefe
| 320418 ||  || — || November 1, 2007 || Kitt Peak || Spacewatch || — || align=right data-sort-value="0.82" | 820 m || 
|-id=419 bgcolor=#d6d6d6
| 320419 ||  || — || November 1, 2007 || Kitt Peak || Spacewatch || HYG || align=right | 3.0 km || 
|-id=420 bgcolor=#d6d6d6
| 320420 ||  || — || November 1, 2007 || Kitt Peak || Spacewatch || EOS || align=right | 2.7 km || 
|-id=421 bgcolor=#fefefe
| 320421 ||  || — || November 1, 2007 || Kitt Peak || Spacewatch || — || align=right | 1.1 km || 
|-id=422 bgcolor=#fefefe
| 320422 ||  || — || November 1, 2007 || Kitt Peak || Spacewatch || — || align=right data-sort-value="0.91" | 910 m || 
|-id=423 bgcolor=#fefefe
| 320423 ||  || — || November 1, 2007 || Kitt Peak || Spacewatch || — || align=right data-sort-value="0.72" | 720 m || 
|-id=424 bgcolor=#fefefe
| 320424 ||  || — || November 1, 2007 || Kitt Peak || Spacewatch || FLO || align=right data-sort-value="0.93" | 930 m || 
|-id=425 bgcolor=#fefefe
| 320425 ||  || — || November 2, 2007 || Kitt Peak || Spacewatch || — || align=right data-sort-value="0.87" | 870 m || 
|-id=426 bgcolor=#E9E9E9
| 320426 ||  || — || November 2, 2007 || Socorro || LINEAR || — || align=right | 2.6 km || 
|-id=427 bgcolor=#fefefe
| 320427 ||  || — || November 2, 2007 || Socorro || LINEAR || — || align=right | 1.1 km || 
|-id=428 bgcolor=#fefefe
| 320428 ||  || — || November 4, 2007 || Socorro || LINEAR || — || align=right data-sort-value="0.91" | 910 m || 
|-id=429 bgcolor=#fefefe
| 320429 ||  || — || November 5, 2007 || Kitami || K. Endate || FLO || align=right data-sort-value="0.72" | 720 m || 
|-id=430 bgcolor=#d6d6d6
| 320430 ||  || — || November 7, 2007 || Eskridge || G. Hug || — || align=right | 4.4 km || 
|-id=431 bgcolor=#fefefe
| 320431 ||  || — || November 7, 2007 || Bisei SG Center || BATTeRS || FLO || align=right data-sort-value="0.77" | 770 m || 
|-id=432 bgcolor=#fefefe
| 320432 ||  || — || November 1, 2007 || Kitt Peak || Spacewatch || V || align=right data-sort-value="0.81" | 810 m || 
|-id=433 bgcolor=#fefefe
| 320433 ||  || — || November 2, 2007 || Mount Lemmon || Mount Lemmon Survey || — || align=right data-sort-value="0.88" | 880 m || 
|-id=434 bgcolor=#E9E9E9
| 320434 ||  || — || November 3, 2007 || Kitt Peak || Spacewatch || — || align=right | 1.7 km || 
|-id=435 bgcolor=#fefefe
| 320435 ||  || — || November 3, 2007 || Kitt Peak || Spacewatch || V || align=right data-sort-value="0.67" | 670 m || 
|-id=436 bgcolor=#fefefe
| 320436 ||  || — || November 3, 2007 || Kitt Peak || Spacewatch || NYS || align=right data-sort-value="0.71" | 710 m || 
|-id=437 bgcolor=#fefefe
| 320437 ||  || — || November 3, 2007 || Kitt Peak || Spacewatch || NYS || align=right data-sort-value="0.59" | 590 m || 
|-id=438 bgcolor=#fefefe
| 320438 ||  || — || November 4, 2007 || Kitt Peak || Spacewatch || — || align=right data-sort-value="0.89" | 890 m || 
|-id=439 bgcolor=#fefefe
| 320439 ||  || — || November 4, 2007 || Kitt Peak || Spacewatch || — || align=right data-sort-value="0.86" | 860 m || 
|-id=440 bgcolor=#fefefe
| 320440 ||  || — || November 7, 2007 || Kitt Peak || Spacewatch || — || align=right data-sort-value="0.94" | 940 m || 
|-id=441 bgcolor=#E9E9E9
| 320441 ||  || — || November 7, 2007 || Mount Lemmon || Mount Lemmon Survey || — || align=right | 1.4 km || 
|-id=442 bgcolor=#d6d6d6
| 320442 ||  || — || November 5, 2007 || Kitt Peak || Spacewatch || — || align=right | 3.1 km || 
|-id=443 bgcolor=#fefefe
| 320443 ||  || — || November 11, 2007 || Bisei SG Center || BATTeRS || FLO || align=right data-sort-value="0.80" | 800 m || 
|-id=444 bgcolor=#fefefe
| 320444 ||  || — || November 8, 2007 || Kitt Peak || Spacewatch || — || align=right data-sort-value="0.98" | 980 m || 
|-id=445 bgcolor=#fefefe
| 320445 ||  || — || November 4, 2007 || Mount Lemmon || Mount Lemmon Survey || NYS || align=right data-sort-value="0.75" | 750 m || 
|-id=446 bgcolor=#d6d6d6
| 320446 ||  || — || November 4, 2007 || Mount Lemmon || Mount Lemmon Survey || THM || align=right | 2.5 km || 
|-id=447 bgcolor=#fefefe
| 320447 ||  || — || November 5, 2007 || Mount Lemmon || Mount Lemmon Survey || — || align=right | 1.2 km || 
|-id=448 bgcolor=#fefefe
| 320448 ||  || — || November 5, 2007 || Mount Lemmon || Mount Lemmon Survey || ERI || align=right | 1.3 km || 
|-id=449 bgcolor=#d6d6d6
| 320449 ||  || — || November 8, 2007 || Mount Lemmon || Mount Lemmon Survey || — || align=right | 4.1 km || 
|-id=450 bgcolor=#fefefe
| 320450 ||  || — || November 9, 2007 || Mount Lemmon || Mount Lemmon Survey || ERI || align=right | 1.7 km || 
|-id=451 bgcolor=#fefefe
| 320451 ||  || — || November 9, 2007 || Catalina || CSS || V || align=right data-sort-value="0.68" | 680 m || 
|-id=452 bgcolor=#d6d6d6
| 320452 ||  || — || November 9, 2007 || Kitt Peak || Spacewatch || — || align=right | 2.5 km || 
|-id=453 bgcolor=#fefefe
| 320453 ||  || — || November 9, 2007 || Kitt Peak || Spacewatch || — || align=right data-sort-value="0.79" | 790 m || 
|-id=454 bgcolor=#fefefe
| 320454 ||  || — || November 9, 2007 || Kitt Peak || Spacewatch || — || align=right data-sort-value="0.78" | 780 m || 
|-id=455 bgcolor=#E9E9E9
| 320455 ||  || — || November 13, 2007 || Kitt Peak || Spacewatch || JUN || align=right | 1.5 km || 
|-id=456 bgcolor=#fefefe
| 320456 ||  || — || November 12, 2007 || Mount Lemmon || Mount Lemmon Survey || — || align=right | 1.1 km || 
|-id=457 bgcolor=#fefefe
| 320457 ||  || — || November 7, 2007 || Kitt Peak || Spacewatch || — || align=right data-sort-value="0.98" | 980 m || 
|-id=458 bgcolor=#fefefe
| 320458 ||  || — || November 7, 2007 || Kitt Peak || Spacewatch || — || align=right data-sort-value="0.88" | 880 m || 
|-id=459 bgcolor=#fefefe
| 320459 ||  || — || November 9, 2007 || Kitt Peak || Spacewatch || — || align=right data-sort-value="0.86" | 860 m || 
|-id=460 bgcolor=#fefefe
| 320460 ||  || — || November 11, 2007 || Mount Lemmon || Mount Lemmon Survey || — || align=right data-sort-value="0.67" | 670 m || 
|-id=461 bgcolor=#fefefe
| 320461 ||  || — || November 14, 2007 || Bisei SG Center || BATTeRS || NYS || align=right data-sort-value="0.84" | 840 m || 
|-id=462 bgcolor=#fefefe
| 320462 ||  || — || March 21, 1999 || Apache Point || SDSS || — || align=right data-sort-value="0.80" | 800 m || 
|-id=463 bgcolor=#fefefe
| 320463 ||  || — || November 13, 2007 || Kitt Peak || Spacewatch || — || align=right data-sort-value="0.80" | 800 m || 
|-id=464 bgcolor=#fefefe
| 320464 ||  || — || November 12, 2007 || Socorro || LINEAR || — || align=right data-sort-value="0.95" | 950 m || 
|-id=465 bgcolor=#fefefe
| 320465 ||  || — || November 13, 2007 || Mount Lemmon || Mount Lemmon Survey || — || align=right | 1.1 km || 
|-id=466 bgcolor=#fefefe
| 320466 ||  || — || November 14, 2007 || Kitt Peak || Spacewatch || — || align=right data-sort-value="0.64" | 640 m || 
|-id=467 bgcolor=#fefefe
| 320467 ||  || — || November 14, 2007 || Kitt Peak || Spacewatch || NYS || align=right data-sort-value="0.79" | 790 m || 
|-id=468 bgcolor=#fefefe
| 320468 ||  || — || November 14, 2007 || Kitt Peak || Spacewatch || V || align=right data-sort-value="0.72" | 720 m || 
|-id=469 bgcolor=#fefefe
| 320469 ||  || — || November 14, 2007 || Kitt Peak || Spacewatch || — || align=right data-sort-value="0.70" | 700 m || 
|-id=470 bgcolor=#d6d6d6
| 320470 ||  || — || November 14, 2007 || Kitt Peak || Spacewatch || — || align=right | 2.9 km || 
|-id=471 bgcolor=#fefefe
| 320471 ||  || — || November 14, 2007 || Kitt Peak || Spacewatch || MAS || align=right data-sort-value="0.71" | 710 m || 
|-id=472 bgcolor=#fefefe
| 320472 ||  || — || November 13, 2007 || Kitt Peak || Spacewatch || FLO || align=right data-sort-value="0.56" | 560 m || 
|-id=473 bgcolor=#d6d6d6
| 320473 ||  || — || November 9, 2007 || Mount Lemmon || Mount Lemmon Survey || 7:4 || align=right | 4.4 km || 
|-id=474 bgcolor=#fefefe
| 320474 ||  || — || November 1, 2007 || Kitt Peak || Spacewatch || — || align=right data-sort-value="0.87" | 870 m || 
|-id=475 bgcolor=#fefefe
| 320475 ||  || — || November 7, 2007 || Kitt Peak || Spacewatch || — || align=right data-sort-value="0.76" | 760 m || 
|-id=476 bgcolor=#fefefe
| 320476 ||  || — || November 14, 2007 || Kitt Peak || Spacewatch || — || align=right | 1.0 km || 
|-id=477 bgcolor=#d6d6d6
| 320477 ||  || — || November 2, 2007 || Socorro || LINEAR || — || align=right | 5.8 km || 
|-id=478 bgcolor=#fefefe
| 320478 ||  || — || November 3, 2007 || Socorro || LINEAR || — || align=right data-sort-value="0.94" | 940 m || 
|-id=479 bgcolor=#fefefe
| 320479 ||  || — || November 4, 2007 || Socorro || LINEAR || FLO || align=right data-sort-value="0.70" | 700 m || 
|-id=480 bgcolor=#fefefe
| 320480 ||  || — || September 17, 2003 || Kitt Peak || Spacewatch || — || align=right data-sort-value="0.93" | 930 m || 
|-id=481 bgcolor=#E9E9E9
| 320481 ||  || — || November 8, 2007 || Mount Lemmon || Mount Lemmon Survey || — || align=right | 1.4 km || 
|-id=482 bgcolor=#fefefe
| 320482 ||  || — || November 9, 2007 || Socorro || LINEAR || — || align=right data-sort-value="0.87" | 870 m || 
|-id=483 bgcolor=#fefefe
| 320483 ||  || — || November 13, 2007 || Catalina || CSS || NYS || align=right data-sort-value="0.60" | 600 m || 
|-id=484 bgcolor=#d6d6d6
| 320484 ||  || — || November 5, 2007 || Mount Lemmon || Mount Lemmon Survey || — || align=right | 2.9 km || 
|-id=485 bgcolor=#fefefe
| 320485 ||  || — || November 8, 2007 || Socorro || LINEAR || — || align=right | 1.2 km || 
|-id=486 bgcolor=#fefefe
| 320486 ||  || — || November 8, 2007 || Catalina || CSS || — || align=right | 1.2 km || 
|-id=487 bgcolor=#fefefe
| 320487 ||  || — || November 11, 2007 || Socorro || LINEAR || FLO || align=right data-sort-value="0.67" | 670 m || 
|-id=488 bgcolor=#fefefe
| 320488 ||  || — || November 15, 2007 || Socorro || LINEAR || V || align=right | 1.1 km || 
|-id=489 bgcolor=#fefefe
| 320489 ||  || — || November 18, 2007 || Bisei SG Center || BATTeRS || — || align=right data-sort-value="0.76" | 760 m || 
|-id=490 bgcolor=#fefefe
| 320490 ||  || — || October 14, 2007 || Mount Lemmon || Mount Lemmon Survey || — || align=right data-sort-value="0.93" | 930 m || 
|-id=491 bgcolor=#fefefe
| 320491 ||  || — || November 17, 2007 || Catalina || CSS || FLO || align=right data-sort-value="0.80" | 800 m || 
|-id=492 bgcolor=#fefefe
| 320492 ||  || — || November 18, 2007 || Mount Lemmon || Mount Lemmon Survey || FLO || align=right data-sort-value="0.74" | 740 m || 
|-id=493 bgcolor=#fefefe
| 320493 ||  || — || November 18, 2007 || Mount Lemmon || Mount Lemmon Survey || MAS || align=right data-sort-value="0.63" | 630 m || 
|-id=494 bgcolor=#d6d6d6
| 320494 ||  || — || November 18, 2007 || Mount Lemmon || Mount Lemmon Survey || HYG || align=right | 3.1 km || 
|-id=495 bgcolor=#d6d6d6
| 320495 ||  || — || November 18, 2007 || Mount Lemmon || Mount Lemmon Survey || KOR || align=right | 1.4 km || 
|-id=496 bgcolor=#fefefe
| 320496 ||  || — || November 18, 2007 || Mount Lemmon || Mount Lemmon Survey || MAS || align=right data-sort-value="0.61" | 610 m || 
|-id=497 bgcolor=#fefefe
| 320497 ||  || — || November 20, 2007 || Mount Lemmon || Mount Lemmon Survey || — || align=right | 1.1 km || 
|-id=498 bgcolor=#E9E9E9
| 320498 ||  || — || November 20, 2007 || Mount Lemmon || Mount Lemmon Survey || AGN || align=right | 1.3 km || 
|-id=499 bgcolor=#fefefe
| 320499 ||  || — || November 21, 2007 || Mount Lemmon || Mount Lemmon Survey || — || align=right | 1.0 km || 
|-id=500 bgcolor=#d6d6d6
| 320500 ||  || — || December 4, 2007 || Kitt Peak || Spacewatch || — || align=right | 3.1 km || 
|}

320501–320600 

|-bgcolor=#fefefe
| 320501 ||  || — || December 4, 2007 || Catalina || CSS || — || align=right data-sort-value="0.93" | 930 m || 
|-id=502 bgcolor=#d6d6d6
| 320502 ||  || — || December 5, 2007 || Catalina || CSS || — || align=right | 4.6 km || 
|-id=503 bgcolor=#fefefe
| 320503 ||  || — || December 9, 2007 || Bisei SG Center || BATTeRS || NYS || align=right data-sort-value="0.58" | 580 m || 
|-id=504 bgcolor=#fefefe
| 320504 ||  || — || December 12, 2007 || La Sagra || OAM Obs. || NYS || align=right data-sort-value="0.70" | 700 m || 
|-id=505 bgcolor=#fefefe
| 320505 ||  || — || December 10, 2007 || Socorro || LINEAR || — || align=right data-sort-value="0.70" | 700 m || 
|-id=506 bgcolor=#fefefe
| 320506 ||  || — || December 10, 2007 || Socorro || LINEAR || — || align=right data-sort-value="0.87" | 870 m || 
|-id=507 bgcolor=#fefefe
| 320507 ||  || — || November 14, 2007 || Mount Lemmon || Mount Lemmon Survey || — || align=right | 1.0 km || 
|-id=508 bgcolor=#d6d6d6
| 320508 ||  || — || December 15, 2007 || Catalina || CSS || EMA || align=right | 5.1 km || 
|-id=509 bgcolor=#fefefe
| 320509 ||  || — || December 15, 2007 || Catalina || CSS || CHL || align=right | 3.0 km || 
|-id=510 bgcolor=#fefefe
| 320510 ||  || — || December 4, 2007 || Mount Lemmon || Mount Lemmon Survey || MAS || align=right data-sort-value="0.63" | 630 m || 
|-id=511 bgcolor=#d6d6d6
| 320511 ||  || — || December 4, 2007 || Kitt Peak || Spacewatch || — || align=right | 2.3 km || 
|-id=512 bgcolor=#fefefe
| 320512 ||  || — || December 4, 2007 || Mount Lemmon || Mount Lemmon Survey || — || align=right | 1.2 km || 
|-id=513 bgcolor=#fefefe
| 320513 ||  || — || December 4, 2007 || Mount Lemmon || Mount Lemmon Survey || NYS || align=right data-sort-value="0.79" | 790 m || 
|-id=514 bgcolor=#fefefe
| 320514 ||  || — || December 5, 2007 || Kitt Peak || Spacewatch || — || align=right data-sort-value="0.67" | 670 m || 
|-id=515 bgcolor=#fefefe
| 320515 ||  || — || December 18, 2007 || Bergisch Gladbac || W. Bickel || — || align=right data-sort-value="0.85" | 850 m || 
|-id=516 bgcolor=#fefefe
| 320516 ||  || — || December 16, 2007 || Junk Bond || D. Healy || — || align=right data-sort-value="0.81" | 810 m || 
|-id=517 bgcolor=#fefefe
| 320517 ||  || — || December 5, 2007 || Kitt Peak || Spacewatch || — || align=right | 1.1 km || 
|-id=518 bgcolor=#fefefe
| 320518 ||  || — || December 16, 2007 || Kitt Peak || Spacewatch || — || align=right | 1.1 km || 
|-id=519 bgcolor=#fefefe
| 320519 ||  || — || December 16, 2007 || Kitt Peak || Spacewatch || — || align=right data-sort-value="0.75" | 750 m || 
|-id=520 bgcolor=#fefefe
| 320520 ||  || — || December 18, 2007 || Mount Lemmon || Mount Lemmon Survey || — || align=right data-sort-value="0.85" | 850 m || 
|-id=521 bgcolor=#fefefe
| 320521 ||  || — || December 28, 2007 || Kitt Peak || Spacewatch || — || align=right data-sort-value="0.93" | 930 m || 
|-id=522 bgcolor=#fefefe
| 320522 ||  || — || December 30, 2007 || Mount Lemmon || Mount Lemmon Survey || NYS || align=right data-sort-value="0.74" | 740 m || 
|-id=523 bgcolor=#fefefe
| 320523 ||  || — || December 30, 2007 || Mount Lemmon || Mount Lemmon Survey || NYS || align=right data-sort-value="0.70" | 700 m || 
|-id=524 bgcolor=#fefefe
| 320524 ||  || — || December 30, 2007 || Catalina || CSS || — || align=right | 1.2 km || 
|-id=525 bgcolor=#fefefe
| 320525 ||  || — || December 30, 2007 || Catalina || CSS || NYS || align=right data-sort-value="0.91" | 910 m || 
|-id=526 bgcolor=#d6d6d6
| 320526 ||  || — || December 30, 2007 || Kitt Peak || Spacewatch || — || align=right | 3.2 km || 
|-id=527 bgcolor=#fefefe
| 320527 ||  || — || December 30, 2007 || Kitt Peak || Spacewatch || MAS || align=right data-sort-value="0.70" | 700 m || 
|-id=528 bgcolor=#fefefe
| 320528 ||  || — || December 30, 2007 || Mount Lemmon || Mount Lemmon Survey || NYS || align=right data-sort-value="0.63" | 630 m || 
|-id=529 bgcolor=#E9E9E9
| 320529 ||  || — || December 30, 2007 || Catalina || CSS || — || align=right | 1.3 km || 
|-id=530 bgcolor=#fefefe
| 320530 ||  || — || December 31, 2007 || Kitt Peak || Spacewatch || — || align=right data-sort-value="0.98" | 980 m || 
|-id=531 bgcolor=#E9E9E9
| 320531 ||  || — || December 31, 2007 || Mount Lemmon || Mount Lemmon Survey || — || align=right data-sort-value="0.83" | 830 m || 
|-id=532 bgcolor=#fefefe
| 320532 ||  || — || December 30, 2007 || Kitt Peak || Spacewatch || FLO || align=right data-sort-value="0.65" | 650 m || 
|-id=533 bgcolor=#fefefe
| 320533 ||  || — || December 31, 2007 || Kitt Peak || Spacewatch || — || align=right data-sort-value="0.96" | 960 m || 
|-id=534 bgcolor=#fefefe
| 320534 ||  || — || December 20, 2007 || Mount Lemmon || Mount Lemmon Survey || MAS || align=right data-sort-value="0.82" | 820 m || 
|-id=535 bgcolor=#fefefe
| 320535 ||  || — || December 30, 2007 || Kitt Peak || Spacewatch || MAS || align=right data-sort-value="0.87" | 870 m || 
|-id=536 bgcolor=#fefefe
| 320536 ||  || — || December 31, 2007 || Mount Lemmon || Mount Lemmon Survey || — || align=right | 1.1 km || 
|-id=537 bgcolor=#fefefe
| 320537 ||  || — || December 18, 2007 || Mount Lemmon || Mount Lemmon Survey || V || align=right data-sort-value="0.75" | 750 m || 
|-id=538 bgcolor=#fefefe
| 320538 ||  || — || December 16, 2007 || Socorro || LINEAR || — || align=right | 1.1 km || 
|-id=539 bgcolor=#fefefe
| 320539 ||  || — || December 17, 2007 || Mount Lemmon || Mount Lemmon Survey || — || align=right | 1.2 km || 
|-id=540 bgcolor=#d6d6d6
| 320540 ||  || — || January 6, 2008 || La Sagra || OAM Obs. || — || align=right | 4.6 km || 
|-id=541 bgcolor=#fefefe
| 320541 ||  || — || January 7, 2008 || Lulin || LUSS || — || align=right | 1.2 km || 
|-id=542 bgcolor=#E9E9E9
| 320542 ||  || — || January 10, 2008 || Mount Lemmon || Mount Lemmon Survey || — || align=right | 1.2 km || 
|-id=543 bgcolor=#fefefe
| 320543 ||  || — || January 10, 2008 || Kitt Peak || Spacewatch || — || align=right | 1.3 km || 
|-id=544 bgcolor=#fefefe
| 320544 ||  || — || January 10, 2008 || Kitt Peak || Spacewatch || NYS || align=right data-sort-value="0.57" | 570 m || 
|-id=545 bgcolor=#E9E9E9
| 320545 ||  || — || January 10, 2008 || Mount Lemmon || Mount Lemmon Survey || — || align=right | 1.1 km || 
|-id=546 bgcolor=#fefefe
| 320546 ||  || — || January 10, 2008 || Kitt Peak || Spacewatch || — || align=right | 1.1 km || 
|-id=547 bgcolor=#fefefe
| 320547 ||  || — || January 10, 2008 || Mount Lemmon || Mount Lemmon Survey || — || align=right | 1.5 km || 
|-id=548 bgcolor=#fefefe
| 320548 ||  || — || January 11, 2008 || Desert Eagle || W. K. Y. Yeung || V || align=right data-sort-value="0.61" | 610 m || 
|-id=549 bgcolor=#fefefe
| 320549 ||  || — || January 10, 2008 || Kitt Peak || Spacewatch || V || align=right data-sort-value="0.78" | 780 m || 
|-id=550 bgcolor=#fefefe
| 320550 ||  || — || January 10, 2008 || Kitt Peak || Spacewatch || V || align=right data-sort-value="0.83" | 830 m || 
|-id=551 bgcolor=#fefefe
| 320551 ||  || — || January 10, 2008 || Mount Lemmon || Mount Lemmon Survey || FLO || align=right data-sort-value="0.66" | 660 m || 
|-id=552 bgcolor=#fefefe
| 320552 ||  || — || January 10, 2008 || Kitt Peak || Spacewatch || — || align=right | 1.1 km || 
|-id=553 bgcolor=#fefefe
| 320553 ||  || — || January 10, 2008 || Mount Lemmon || Mount Lemmon Survey || — || align=right | 1.0 km || 
|-id=554 bgcolor=#fefefe
| 320554 ||  || — || January 10, 2008 || Mount Lemmon || Mount Lemmon Survey || MAS || align=right | 1.1 km || 
|-id=555 bgcolor=#fefefe
| 320555 ||  || — || January 10, 2008 || Catalina || CSS || — || align=right | 1.2 km || 
|-id=556 bgcolor=#C2FFFF
| 320556 ||  || — || January 10, 2008 || Kitt Peak || Spacewatch || L5 || align=right | 14 km || 
|-id=557 bgcolor=#fefefe
| 320557 ||  || — || January 11, 2008 || Kitt Peak || Spacewatch || — || align=right | 1.1 km || 
|-id=558 bgcolor=#d6d6d6
| 320558 ||  || — || January 11, 2008 || Kitt Peak || Spacewatch || — || align=right | 2.6 km || 
|-id=559 bgcolor=#E9E9E9
| 320559 ||  || — || January 11, 2008 || Kitt Peak || Spacewatch || — || align=right | 1.2 km || 
|-id=560 bgcolor=#fefefe
| 320560 ||  || — || January 11, 2008 || Mount Lemmon || Mount Lemmon Survey || — || align=right data-sort-value="0.86" | 860 m || 
|-id=561 bgcolor=#fefefe
| 320561 ||  || — || January 11, 2008 || Kitt Peak || Spacewatch || — || align=right data-sort-value="0.92" | 920 m || 
|-id=562 bgcolor=#fefefe
| 320562 ||  || — || January 10, 2008 || Kitt Peak || Spacewatch || MAS || align=right data-sort-value="0.86" | 860 m || 
|-id=563 bgcolor=#fefefe
| 320563 ||  || — || January 12, 2008 || Kitt Peak || Spacewatch || MAS || align=right data-sort-value="0.82" | 820 m || 
|-id=564 bgcolor=#fefefe
| 320564 ||  || — || January 14, 2008 || Kitt Peak || Spacewatch || — || align=right | 1.1 km || 
|-id=565 bgcolor=#E9E9E9
| 320565 ||  || — || January 15, 2008 || Mount Lemmon || Mount Lemmon Survey || MAR || align=right | 1.4 km || 
|-id=566 bgcolor=#fefefe
| 320566 ||  || — || February 18, 2001 || Kitt Peak || Spacewatch || — || align=right | 1.0 km || 
|-id=567 bgcolor=#fefefe
| 320567 ||  || — || January 12, 2008 || Kitt Peak || Spacewatch || V || align=right data-sort-value="0.81" | 810 m || 
|-id=568 bgcolor=#fefefe
| 320568 ||  || — || January 13, 2008 || Kitt Peak || Spacewatch || — || align=right | 1.2 km || 
|-id=569 bgcolor=#fefefe
| 320569 ||  || — || January 14, 2008 || Kitt Peak || Spacewatch || NYS || align=right data-sort-value="0.79" | 790 m || 
|-id=570 bgcolor=#fefefe
| 320570 ||  || — || January 14, 2008 || Kitt Peak || Spacewatch || — || align=right data-sort-value="0.99" | 990 m || 
|-id=571 bgcolor=#fefefe
| 320571 ||  || — || January 15, 2008 || Mount Lemmon || Mount Lemmon Survey || — || align=right data-sort-value="0.87" | 870 m || 
|-id=572 bgcolor=#fefefe
| 320572 ||  || — || January 15, 2008 || Mount Lemmon || Mount Lemmon Survey || MAS || align=right data-sort-value="0.70" | 700 m || 
|-id=573 bgcolor=#fefefe
| 320573 ||  || — || January 1, 2008 || Kitt Peak || Spacewatch || — || align=right data-sort-value="0.88" | 880 m || 
|-id=574 bgcolor=#fefefe
| 320574 ||  || — || January 15, 2008 || Mount Lemmon || Mount Lemmon Survey || — || align=right data-sort-value="0.91" | 910 m || 
|-id=575 bgcolor=#fefefe
| 320575 ||  || — || January 15, 2008 || Kitt Peak || Spacewatch || CLA || align=right | 2.7 km || 
|-id=576 bgcolor=#fefefe
| 320576 ||  || — || January 15, 2008 || Kitt Peak || Spacewatch || — || align=right data-sort-value="0.96" | 960 m || 
|-id=577 bgcolor=#fefefe
| 320577 ||  || — || January 10, 2008 || Kitt Peak || Spacewatch || MAS || align=right data-sort-value="0.81" | 810 m || 
|-id=578 bgcolor=#fefefe
| 320578 ||  || — || January 11, 2008 || Kitt Peak || Spacewatch || — || align=right | 1.7 km || 
|-id=579 bgcolor=#fefefe
| 320579 ||  || — || January 11, 2008 || Kitt Peak || Spacewatch || — || align=right data-sort-value="0.97" | 970 m || 
|-id=580 bgcolor=#fefefe
| 320580 ||  || — || November 7, 2007 || Mount Lemmon || Mount Lemmon Survey || — || align=right | 1.1 km || 
|-id=581 bgcolor=#E9E9E9
| 320581 ||  || — || January 10, 2008 || Catalina || CSS || — || align=right | 3.6 km || 
|-id=582 bgcolor=#fefefe
| 320582 ||  || — || January 13, 2008 || Kitt Peak || Spacewatch || — || align=right data-sort-value="0.89" | 890 m || 
|-id=583 bgcolor=#E9E9E9
| 320583 ||  || — || January 16, 2008 || Kitt Peak || Spacewatch || — || align=right | 1.4 km || 
|-id=584 bgcolor=#fefefe
| 320584 ||  || — || January 17, 2008 || Mount Lemmon || Mount Lemmon Survey || V || align=right data-sort-value="0.67" | 670 m || 
|-id=585 bgcolor=#fefefe
| 320585 ||  || — || January 18, 2008 || Mount Lemmon || Mount Lemmon Survey || — || align=right | 1.2 km || 
|-id=586 bgcolor=#fefefe
| 320586 ||  || — || January 30, 2008 || La Sagra || OAM Obs. || — || align=right data-sort-value="0.90" | 900 m || 
|-id=587 bgcolor=#fefefe
| 320587 ||  || — || January 29, 2008 || La Sagra || OAM Obs. || — || align=right | 1.1 km || 
|-id=588 bgcolor=#fefefe
| 320588 ||  || — || January 30, 2008 || Catalina || CSS || V || align=right data-sort-value="0.76" | 760 m || 
|-id=589 bgcolor=#fefefe
| 320589 ||  || — || January 30, 2008 || Catalina || CSS || — || align=right | 1.0 km || 
|-id=590 bgcolor=#E9E9E9
| 320590 ||  || — || January 30, 2008 || Mount Lemmon || Mount Lemmon Survey || — || align=right | 2.4 km || 
|-id=591 bgcolor=#fefefe
| 320591 ||  || — || January 30, 2008 || Eskridge || G. Hug || MAS || align=right data-sort-value="0.94" | 940 m || 
|-id=592 bgcolor=#fefefe
| 320592 ||  || — || January 30, 2008 || Catalina || CSS || NYS || align=right data-sort-value="0.72" | 720 m || 
|-id=593 bgcolor=#d6d6d6
| 320593 ||  || — || January 30, 2008 || Mount Lemmon || Mount Lemmon Survey || KOR || align=right | 1.4 km || 
|-id=594 bgcolor=#E9E9E9
| 320594 ||  || — || January 30, 2008 || Kitt Peak || Spacewatch || — || align=right | 1.5 km || 
|-id=595 bgcolor=#fefefe
| 320595 ||  || — || January 30, 2008 || Catalina || CSS || NYS || align=right data-sort-value="0.98" | 980 m || 
|-id=596 bgcolor=#fefefe
| 320596 ||  || — || January 30, 2008 || Kitt Peak || Spacewatch || V || align=right | 1.0 km || 
|-id=597 bgcolor=#fefefe
| 320597 ||  || — || January 31, 2008 || Mount Lemmon || Mount Lemmon Survey || — || align=right | 1.1 km || 
|-id=598 bgcolor=#fefefe
| 320598 ||  || — || January 30, 2008 || Catalina || CSS || V || align=right data-sort-value="0.81" | 810 m || 
|-id=599 bgcolor=#E9E9E9
| 320599 ||  || — || January 31, 2008 || Socorro || LINEAR || — || align=right | 1.2 km || 
|-id=600 bgcolor=#fefefe
| 320600 ||  || — || January 30, 2008 || Catalina || CSS || NYS || align=right data-sort-value="0.99" | 990 m || 
|}

320601–320700 

|-bgcolor=#fefefe
| 320601 ||  || — || January 30, 2008 || Catalina || CSS || NYS || align=right | 1.1 km || 
|-id=602 bgcolor=#fefefe
| 320602 ||  || — || January 16, 2008 || Kitt Peak || Spacewatch || — || align=right data-sort-value="0.99" | 990 m || 
|-id=603 bgcolor=#E9E9E9
| 320603 ||  || — || January 19, 2008 || Mount Lemmon || Mount Lemmon Survey || EUN || align=right | 1.5 km || 
|-id=604 bgcolor=#fefefe
| 320604 ||  || — || January 27, 2008 || Antares || ARO || — || align=right | 1.2 km || 
|-id=605 bgcolor=#E9E9E9
| 320605 ||  || — || January 18, 2008 || Mount Lemmon || Mount Lemmon Survey || — || align=right | 1.8 km || 
|-id=606 bgcolor=#fefefe
| 320606 ||  || — || February 1, 2008 || Mount Lemmon || Mount Lemmon Survey || NYS || align=right data-sort-value="0.86" | 860 m || 
|-id=607 bgcolor=#E9E9E9
| 320607 ||  || — || February 1, 2008 || Mount Lemmon || Mount Lemmon Survey || — || align=right | 3.0 km || 
|-id=608 bgcolor=#fefefe
| 320608 ||  || — || February 1, 2008 || Mount Lemmon || Mount Lemmon Survey || — || align=right data-sort-value="0.90" | 900 m || 
|-id=609 bgcolor=#fefefe
| 320609 ||  || — || February 1, 2008 || Mount Lemmon || Mount Lemmon Survey || — || align=right data-sort-value="0.95" | 950 m || 
|-id=610 bgcolor=#E9E9E9
| 320610 ||  || — || February 2, 2008 || Kitt Peak || Spacewatch || — || align=right | 2.1 km || 
|-id=611 bgcolor=#E9E9E9
| 320611 ||  || — || February 3, 2008 || Kitt Peak || Spacewatch || — || align=right | 2.8 km || 
|-id=612 bgcolor=#E9E9E9
| 320612 ||  || — || February 3, 2008 || Kitt Peak || Spacewatch || — || align=right | 1.4 km || 
|-id=613 bgcolor=#E9E9E9
| 320613 ||  || — || February 9, 2008 || Catalina || CSS || BAR || align=right | 1.4 km || 
|-id=614 bgcolor=#fefefe
| 320614 ||  || — || February 1, 2008 || Kitt Peak || Spacewatch || — || align=right | 1.1 km || 
|-id=615 bgcolor=#fefefe
| 320615 ||  || — || February 1, 2008 || Kitt Peak || Spacewatch || — || align=right data-sort-value="0.81" | 810 m || 
|-id=616 bgcolor=#fefefe
| 320616 ||  || — || February 1, 2008 || Kitt Peak || Spacewatch || NYS || align=right data-sort-value="0.83" | 830 m || 
|-id=617 bgcolor=#E9E9E9
| 320617 ||  || — || February 2, 2008 || Kitt Peak || Spacewatch || — || align=right data-sort-value="0.81" | 810 m || 
|-id=618 bgcolor=#E9E9E9
| 320618 ||  || — || February 2, 2008 || Kitt Peak || Spacewatch || — || align=right | 3.2 km || 
|-id=619 bgcolor=#E9E9E9
| 320619 ||  || — || February 2, 2008 || Kitt Peak || Spacewatch || — || align=right | 1.2 km || 
|-id=620 bgcolor=#fefefe
| 320620 ||  || — || February 2, 2008 || Kitt Peak || Spacewatch || — || align=right data-sort-value="0.83" | 830 m || 
|-id=621 bgcolor=#fefefe
| 320621 ||  || — || February 2, 2008 || Kitt Peak || Spacewatch || NYS || align=right data-sort-value="0.71" | 710 m || 
|-id=622 bgcolor=#E9E9E9
| 320622 ||  || — || February 2, 2008 || Kitt Peak || Spacewatch || — || align=right data-sort-value="0.99" | 990 m || 
|-id=623 bgcolor=#fefefe
| 320623 ||  || — || February 2, 2008 || Mount Lemmon || Mount Lemmon Survey || NYS || align=right data-sort-value="0.76" | 760 m || 
|-id=624 bgcolor=#fefefe
| 320624 ||  || — || February 2, 2008 || Kitt Peak || Spacewatch || V || align=right data-sort-value="0.93" | 930 m || 
|-id=625 bgcolor=#E9E9E9
| 320625 ||  || — || February 2, 2008 || Kitt Peak || Spacewatch || EUN || align=right | 1.1 km || 
|-id=626 bgcolor=#fefefe
| 320626 ||  || — || February 2, 2008 || Kitt Peak || Spacewatch || — || align=right data-sort-value="0.80" | 800 m || 
|-id=627 bgcolor=#fefefe
| 320627 ||  || — || February 6, 2008 || Anderson Mesa || LONEOS || CLA || align=right | 2.4 km || 
|-id=628 bgcolor=#fefefe
| 320628 ||  || — || February 7, 2008 || Pla D'Arguines || R. Ferrando || V || align=right data-sort-value="0.78" | 780 m || 
|-id=629 bgcolor=#fefefe
| 320629 ||  || — || February 9, 2008 || Dauban || F. Kugel || — || align=right data-sort-value="0.91" | 910 m || 
|-id=630 bgcolor=#fefefe
| 320630 ||  || — || February 9, 2008 || Dauban || F. Kugel || — || align=right data-sort-value="0.97" | 970 m || 
|-id=631 bgcolor=#E9E9E9
| 320631 ||  || — || February 10, 2008 || Bergisch Gladbac || W. Bickel || — || align=right | 2.4 km || 
|-id=632 bgcolor=#fefefe
| 320632 ||  || — || February 6, 2008 || Catalina || CSS || V || align=right data-sort-value="0.79" | 790 m || 
|-id=633 bgcolor=#E9E9E9
| 320633 ||  || — || February 6, 2008 || Catalina || CSS || — || align=right | 1.0 km || 
|-id=634 bgcolor=#d6d6d6
| 320634 ||  || — || February 7, 2008 || Kitt Peak || Spacewatch || HYG || align=right | 3.3 km || 
|-id=635 bgcolor=#d6d6d6
| 320635 ||  || — || February 7, 2008 || Kitt Peak || Spacewatch || — || align=right | 3.5 km || 
|-id=636 bgcolor=#fefefe
| 320636 ||  || — || February 7, 2008 || Mount Lemmon || Mount Lemmon Survey || NYS || align=right data-sort-value="0.93" | 930 m || 
|-id=637 bgcolor=#E9E9E9
| 320637 ||  || — || February 7, 2008 || Mount Lemmon || Mount Lemmon Survey || — || align=right | 2.4 km || 
|-id=638 bgcolor=#E9E9E9
| 320638 ||  || — || February 7, 2008 || Mount Lemmon || Mount Lemmon Survey || — || align=right data-sort-value="0.92" | 920 m || 
|-id=639 bgcolor=#E9E9E9
| 320639 ||  || — || September 21, 2001 || Socorro || LINEAR || WIT || align=right | 1.4 km || 
|-id=640 bgcolor=#fefefe
| 320640 ||  || — || February 8, 2008 || Kitt Peak || Spacewatch || V || align=right data-sort-value="0.60" | 600 m || 
|-id=641 bgcolor=#fefefe
| 320641 ||  || — || February 8, 2008 || Kitt Peak || Spacewatch || NYS || align=right data-sort-value="0.84" | 840 m || 
|-id=642 bgcolor=#fefefe
| 320642 ||  || — || February 9, 2008 || Kitt Peak || Spacewatch || NYS || align=right data-sort-value="0.83" | 830 m || 
|-id=643 bgcolor=#fefefe
| 320643 ||  || — || February 9, 2008 || Mount Lemmon || Mount Lemmon Survey || — || align=right | 1.1 km || 
|-id=644 bgcolor=#d6d6d6
| 320644 ||  || — || February 10, 2008 || Kitt Peak || Spacewatch || — || align=right | 4.9 km || 
|-id=645 bgcolor=#fefefe
| 320645 ||  || — || February 12, 2008 || Wildberg || R. Apitzsch || — || align=right data-sort-value="0.80" | 800 m || 
|-id=646 bgcolor=#fefefe
| 320646 ||  || — || February 9, 2008 || Mayhill || W. G. Dillon || — || align=right data-sort-value="0.96" | 960 m || 
|-id=647 bgcolor=#fefefe
| 320647 ||  || — || February 8, 2008 || Kitt Peak || Spacewatch || — || align=right | 1.1 km || 
|-id=648 bgcolor=#fefefe
| 320648 ||  || — || February 8, 2008 || Kitt Peak || Spacewatch || NYS || align=right data-sort-value="0.77" | 770 m || 
|-id=649 bgcolor=#fefefe
| 320649 ||  || — || February 8, 2008 || Kitt Peak || Spacewatch || — || align=right | 1.1 km || 
|-id=650 bgcolor=#fefefe
| 320650 ||  || — || February 8, 2008 || Mount Lemmon || Mount Lemmon Survey || MAS || align=right data-sort-value="0.77" | 770 m || 
|-id=651 bgcolor=#fefefe
| 320651 ||  || — || February 8, 2008 || Kitt Peak || Spacewatch || — || align=right data-sort-value="0.74" | 740 m || 
|-id=652 bgcolor=#E9E9E9
| 320652 ||  || — || February 8, 2008 || Kitt Peak || Spacewatch || — || align=right data-sort-value="0.83" | 830 m || 
|-id=653 bgcolor=#E9E9E9
| 320653 ||  || — || May 24, 2001 || Cerro Tololo || M. W. Buie || — || align=right | 3.3 km || 
|-id=654 bgcolor=#E9E9E9
| 320654 ||  || — || February 8, 2008 || Kitt Peak || Spacewatch || — || align=right | 1.2 km || 
|-id=655 bgcolor=#fefefe
| 320655 ||  || — || February 9, 2008 || Kitt Peak || Spacewatch || — || align=right | 1.0 km || 
|-id=656 bgcolor=#fefefe
| 320656 ||  || — || February 9, 2008 || Kitt Peak || Spacewatch || — || align=right data-sort-value="0.88" | 880 m || 
|-id=657 bgcolor=#fefefe
| 320657 ||  || — || February 9, 2008 || Mount Lemmon || Mount Lemmon Survey || — || align=right | 1.1 km || 
|-id=658 bgcolor=#E9E9E9
| 320658 ||  || — || February 9, 2008 || Catalina || CSS || — || align=right | 1.2 km || 
|-id=659 bgcolor=#E9E9E9
| 320659 ||  || — || April 13, 2000 || Kitt Peak || Spacewatch || — || align=right | 1.2 km || 
|-id=660 bgcolor=#E9E9E9
| 320660 ||  || — || February 9, 2008 || Kitt Peak || Spacewatch || — || align=right | 1.7 km || 
|-id=661 bgcolor=#E9E9E9
| 320661 ||  || — || February 10, 2008 || Kitt Peak || Spacewatch || — || align=right | 3.0 km || 
|-id=662 bgcolor=#E9E9E9
| 320662 ||  || — || February 10, 2008 || Kitt Peak || Spacewatch || — || align=right | 1.9 km || 
|-id=663 bgcolor=#fefefe
| 320663 ||  || — || September 13, 2002 || Palomar || NEAT || — || align=right | 1.1 km || 
|-id=664 bgcolor=#E9E9E9
| 320664 ||  || — || February 6, 2008 || Socorro || LINEAR || MAR || align=right | 1.1 km || 
|-id=665 bgcolor=#E9E9E9
| 320665 ||  || — || February 7, 2008 || Socorro || LINEAR || MAR || align=right | 1.4 km || 
|-id=666 bgcolor=#fefefe
| 320666 ||  || — || February 6, 2008 || Catalina || CSS || — || align=right | 1.1 km || 
|-id=667 bgcolor=#E9E9E9
| 320667 ||  || — || February 6, 2008 || Catalina || CSS || — || align=right | 1.3 km || 
|-id=668 bgcolor=#fefefe
| 320668 ||  || — || February 7, 2008 || Catalina || CSS || — || align=right data-sort-value="0.91" | 910 m || 
|-id=669 bgcolor=#E9E9E9
| 320669 ||  || — || February 8, 2008 || Catalina || CSS || — || align=right | 1.2 km || 
|-id=670 bgcolor=#fefefe
| 320670 ||  || — || February 13, 2008 || Catalina || CSS || — || align=right data-sort-value="0.91" | 910 m || 
|-id=671 bgcolor=#fefefe
| 320671 ||  || — || February 6, 2008 || Catalina || CSS || — || align=right | 1.2 km || 
|-id=672 bgcolor=#fefefe
| 320672 ||  || — || November 10, 1999 || Kitt Peak || Spacewatch || — || align=right data-sort-value="0.86" | 860 m || 
|-id=673 bgcolor=#d6d6d6
| 320673 ||  || — || February 7, 2008 || Mount Lemmon || Mount Lemmon Survey || — || align=right | 3.0 km || 
|-id=674 bgcolor=#E9E9E9
| 320674 ||  || — || February 8, 2008 || Mount Lemmon || Mount Lemmon Survey || NEM || align=right | 2.7 km || 
|-id=675 bgcolor=#E9E9E9
| 320675 ||  || — || February 9, 2008 || Mount Lemmon || Mount Lemmon Survey || — || align=right | 2.3 km || 
|-id=676 bgcolor=#E9E9E9
| 320676 ||  || — || February 11, 2008 || Mount Lemmon || Mount Lemmon Survey || RAF || align=right | 1.1 km || 
|-id=677 bgcolor=#E9E9E9
| 320677 ||  || — || February 9, 2008 || Kitt Peak || Spacewatch || — || align=right data-sort-value="0.80" | 800 m || 
|-id=678 bgcolor=#E9E9E9
| 320678 ||  || — || February 2, 2008 || Kitt Peak || Spacewatch || — || align=right | 1.5 km || 
|-id=679 bgcolor=#fefefe
| 320679 ||  || — || February 2, 2008 || Mount Lemmon || Mount Lemmon Survey || NYS || align=right data-sort-value="0.70" | 700 m || 
|-id=680 bgcolor=#E9E9E9
| 320680 ||  || — || October 17, 2006 || Catalina || CSS || — || align=right | 1.9 km || 
|-id=681 bgcolor=#fefefe
| 320681 ||  || — || February 3, 2008 || Catalina || CSS || — || align=right | 1.3 km || 
|-id=682 bgcolor=#fefefe
| 320682 ||  || — || February 2, 2008 || Kitt Peak || Spacewatch || — || align=right data-sort-value="0.85" | 850 m || 
|-id=683 bgcolor=#E9E9E9
| 320683 ||  || — || February 3, 2008 || Catalina || CSS || GEF || align=right | 1.5 km || 
|-id=684 bgcolor=#E9E9E9
| 320684 ||  || — || February 3, 2008 || Kitt Peak || Spacewatch || MIS || align=right | 3.1 km || 
|-id=685 bgcolor=#fefefe
| 320685 ||  || — || February 6, 2008 || Socorro || LINEAR || — || align=right | 1.2 km || 
|-id=686 bgcolor=#fefefe
| 320686 ||  || — || February 10, 2008 || Kitt Peak || Spacewatch || V || align=right data-sort-value="0.84" | 840 m || 
|-id=687 bgcolor=#E9E9E9
| 320687 ||  || — || February 11, 2008 || Mount Lemmon || Mount Lemmon Survey || — || align=right | 1.1 km || 
|-id=688 bgcolor=#E9E9E9
| 320688 ||  || — || February 12, 2008 || Mount Lemmon || Mount Lemmon Survey || — || align=right | 1.2 km || 
|-id=689 bgcolor=#E9E9E9
| 320689 ||  || — || February 12, 2008 || Mount Lemmon || Mount Lemmon Survey || — || align=right | 1.4 km || 
|-id=690 bgcolor=#E9E9E9
| 320690 ||  || — || February 13, 2008 || Socorro || LINEAR || MAR || align=right | 1.2 km || 
|-id=691 bgcolor=#fefefe
| 320691 ||  || — || February 13, 2008 || Socorro || LINEAR || — || align=right | 1.1 km || 
|-id=692 bgcolor=#fefefe
| 320692 ||  || — || February 24, 2008 || Junk Bond || D. Healy || EUT || align=right data-sort-value="0.89" | 890 m || 
|-id=693 bgcolor=#fefefe
| 320693 ||  || — || February 24, 2008 || Mount Lemmon || Mount Lemmon Survey || — || align=right data-sort-value="0.88" | 880 m || 
|-id=694 bgcolor=#fefefe
| 320694 ||  || — || February 24, 2008 || Mount Lemmon || Mount Lemmon Survey || — || align=right data-sort-value="0.77" | 770 m || 
|-id=695 bgcolor=#E9E9E9
| 320695 ||  || — || February 26, 2008 || Kitt Peak || Spacewatch || — || align=right | 1.4 km || 
|-id=696 bgcolor=#E9E9E9
| 320696 ||  || — || February 26, 2008 || Mount Lemmon || Mount Lemmon Survey || — || align=right | 2.9 km || 
|-id=697 bgcolor=#fefefe
| 320697 ||  || — || February 26, 2008 || Mount Lemmon || Mount Lemmon Survey || MAS || align=right data-sort-value="0.81" | 810 m || 
|-id=698 bgcolor=#fefefe
| 320698 ||  || — || February 26, 2008 || Mount Lemmon || Mount Lemmon Survey || — || align=right | 1.3 km || 
|-id=699 bgcolor=#d6d6d6
| 320699 ||  || — || February 28, 2008 || Mount Lemmon || Mount Lemmon Survey || KOR || align=right | 2.0 km || 
|-id=700 bgcolor=#E9E9E9
| 320700 ||  || — || February 29, 2008 || Catalina || CSS || — || align=right | 1.6 km || 
|}

320701–320800 

|-bgcolor=#fefefe
| 320701 ||  || — || February 11, 2008 || Kitt Peak || Spacewatch || — || align=right | 1.0 km || 
|-id=702 bgcolor=#d6d6d6
| 320702 ||  || — || February 27, 2008 || Kitt Peak || Spacewatch || — || align=right | 2.4 km || 
|-id=703 bgcolor=#E9E9E9
| 320703 ||  || — || February 27, 2008 || Kitt Peak || Spacewatch || EUN || align=right | 1.5 km || 
|-id=704 bgcolor=#E9E9E9
| 320704 ||  || — || February 27, 2008 || Mount Lemmon || Mount Lemmon Survey || HNS || align=right | 1.7 km || 
|-id=705 bgcolor=#E9E9E9
| 320705 ||  || — || February 27, 2008 || Mount Lemmon || Mount Lemmon Survey || — || align=right | 1.0 km || 
|-id=706 bgcolor=#E9E9E9
| 320706 ||  || — || February 27, 2008 || Kitt Peak || Spacewatch || EUN || align=right | 1.8 km || 
|-id=707 bgcolor=#E9E9E9
| 320707 ||  || — || February 27, 2008 || Mount Lemmon || Mount Lemmon Survey || — || align=right | 1.4 km || 
|-id=708 bgcolor=#fefefe
| 320708 ||  || — || February 28, 2008 || Catalina || CSS || — || align=right | 1.1 km || 
|-id=709 bgcolor=#E9E9E9
| 320709 ||  || — || February 28, 2008 || Kitt Peak || Spacewatch || MAR || align=right | 1.4 km || 
|-id=710 bgcolor=#E9E9E9
| 320710 ||  || — || February 28, 2008 || Kitt Peak || Spacewatch || — || align=right | 1.1 km || 
|-id=711 bgcolor=#E9E9E9
| 320711 ||  || — || January 10, 2008 || Mount Lemmon || Mount Lemmon Survey || — || align=right | 1.3 km || 
|-id=712 bgcolor=#E9E9E9
| 320712 ||  || — || February 29, 2008 || Kitt Peak || Spacewatch || — || align=right | 3.2 km || 
|-id=713 bgcolor=#E9E9E9
| 320713 ||  || — || February 28, 2008 || Mount Lemmon || Mount Lemmon Survey || — || align=right | 1.6 km || 
|-id=714 bgcolor=#fefefe
| 320714 ||  || — || February 27, 2008 || Mount Lemmon || Mount Lemmon Survey || — || align=right | 1.4 km || 
|-id=715 bgcolor=#fefefe
| 320715 ||  || — || February 28, 2008 || Kitt Peak || Spacewatch || V || align=right data-sort-value="0.92" | 920 m || 
|-id=716 bgcolor=#E9E9E9
| 320716 ||  || — || February 28, 2008 || Mount Lemmon || Mount Lemmon Survey || — || align=right | 1.1 km || 
|-id=717 bgcolor=#E9E9E9
| 320717 ||  || — || February 28, 2008 || Mount Lemmon || Mount Lemmon Survey || — || align=right | 1.0 km || 
|-id=718 bgcolor=#d6d6d6
| 320718 ||  || — || December 24, 2006 || Kitt Peak || Spacewatch || CHA || align=right | 2.7 km || 
|-id=719 bgcolor=#E9E9E9
| 320719 ||  || — || February 29, 2008 || Kitt Peak || Spacewatch || — || align=right | 1.8 km || 
|-id=720 bgcolor=#fefefe
| 320720 ||  || — || February 28, 2008 || Mount Lemmon || Mount Lemmon Survey || MAS || align=right data-sort-value="0.89" | 890 m || 
|-id=721 bgcolor=#E9E9E9
| 320721 ||  || — || February 27, 2008 || Kitt Peak || Spacewatch || MIS || align=right | 2.2 km || 
|-id=722 bgcolor=#E9E9E9
| 320722 ||  || — || February 28, 2008 || Kitt Peak || Spacewatch || — || align=right | 1.6 km || 
|-id=723 bgcolor=#E9E9E9
| 320723 ||  || — || February 29, 2008 || Purple Mountain || PMO NEO || — || align=right data-sort-value="0.77" | 770 m || 
|-id=724 bgcolor=#E9E9E9
| 320724 ||  || — || February 29, 2008 || Mount Lemmon || Mount Lemmon Survey || — || align=right | 1.8 km || 
|-id=725 bgcolor=#E9E9E9
| 320725 ||  || — || February 27, 2008 || Mount Lemmon || Mount Lemmon Survey || — || align=right | 1.6 km || 
|-id=726 bgcolor=#E9E9E9
| 320726 ||  || — || February 27, 2008 || Mount Lemmon || Mount Lemmon Survey || HEN || align=right | 1.1 km || 
|-id=727 bgcolor=#E9E9E9
| 320727 ||  || — || March 1, 2008 || Kitt Peak || Spacewatch || — || align=right | 1.1 km || 
|-id=728 bgcolor=#d6d6d6
| 320728 ||  || — || January 8, 2002 || Socorro || LINEAR || — || align=right | 4.2 km || 
|-id=729 bgcolor=#E9E9E9
| 320729 ||  || — || March 1, 2008 || Kitt Peak || Spacewatch || — || align=right | 1.5 km || 
|-id=730 bgcolor=#E9E9E9
| 320730 ||  || — || March 1, 2008 || Kitt Peak || Spacewatch || — || align=right | 3.0 km || 
|-id=731 bgcolor=#fefefe
| 320731 ||  || — || March 1, 2008 || Kitt Peak || Spacewatch || — || align=right | 1.3 km || 
|-id=732 bgcolor=#fefefe
| 320732 ||  || — || March 1, 2008 || Kitt Peak || Spacewatch || V || align=right | 1.0 km || 
|-id=733 bgcolor=#E9E9E9
| 320733 ||  || — || March 2, 2008 || Kitt Peak || Spacewatch || — || align=right | 1.4 km || 
|-id=734 bgcolor=#d6d6d6
| 320734 ||  || — || March 2, 2008 || Kitt Peak || Spacewatch || — || align=right | 3.1 km || 
|-id=735 bgcolor=#E9E9E9
| 320735 ||  || — || March 4, 2008 || Mount Lemmon || Mount Lemmon Survey || — || align=right | 1.7 km || 
|-id=736 bgcolor=#d6d6d6
| 320736 ||  || — || March 5, 2008 || Mount Lemmon || Mount Lemmon Survey || — || align=right | 3.1 km || 
|-id=737 bgcolor=#E9E9E9
| 320737 ||  || — || March 3, 2008 || Kitt Peak || Spacewatch || — || align=right | 1.4 km || 
|-id=738 bgcolor=#E9E9E9
| 320738 ||  || — || March 3, 2008 || Kitt Peak || Spacewatch || HNS || align=right | 1.4 km || 
|-id=739 bgcolor=#fefefe
| 320739 ||  || — || March 4, 2008 || Kitt Peak || Spacewatch || — || align=right data-sort-value="0.84" | 840 m || 
|-id=740 bgcolor=#E9E9E9
| 320740 ||  || — || March 4, 2008 || Kitt Peak || Spacewatch || — || align=right | 1.2 km || 
|-id=741 bgcolor=#E9E9E9
| 320741 ||  || — || March 4, 2008 || Kitt Peak || Spacewatch || — || align=right | 2.6 km || 
|-id=742 bgcolor=#E9E9E9
| 320742 ||  || — || March 4, 2008 || Kitt Peak || Spacewatch || — || align=right | 2.2 km || 
|-id=743 bgcolor=#E9E9E9
| 320743 ||  || — || March 5, 2008 || Kitt Peak || Spacewatch || — || align=right | 1.7 km || 
|-id=744 bgcolor=#E9E9E9
| 320744 ||  || — || March 5, 2008 || Mount Lemmon || Mount Lemmon Survey || — || align=right | 1.7 km || 
|-id=745 bgcolor=#E9E9E9
| 320745 ||  || — || March 5, 2008 || Kitt Peak || Spacewatch || EUN || align=right | 1.4 km || 
|-id=746 bgcolor=#E9E9E9
| 320746 ||  || — || March 6, 2008 || Kitt Peak || Spacewatch || — || align=right | 2.6 km || 
|-id=747 bgcolor=#E9E9E9
| 320747 ||  || — || March 6, 2008 || Kitt Peak || Spacewatch || — || align=right | 2.6 km || 
|-id=748 bgcolor=#E9E9E9
| 320748 ||  || — || March 6, 2008 || Mount Lemmon || Mount Lemmon Survey || — || align=right | 2.0 km || 
|-id=749 bgcolor=#E9E9E9
| 320749 ||  || — || March 6, 2008 || Kitt Peak || Spacewatch || HEN || align=right | 1.2 km || 
|-id=750 bgcolor=#fefefe
| 320750 ||  || — || March 8, 2008 || Mount Lemmon || Mount Lemmon Survey || NYS || align=right data-sort-value="0.82" | 820 m || 
|-id=751 bgcolor=#fefefe
| 320751 ||  || — || March 8, 2008 || Catalina || CSS || — || align=right data-sort-value="0.92" | 920 m || 
|-id=752 bgcolor=#E9E9E9
| 320752 ||  || — || March 9, 2008 || Mount Lemmon || Mount Lemmon Survey || — || align=right data-sort-value="0.78" | 780 m || 
|-id=753 bgcolor=#E9E9E9
| 320753 ||  || — || March 9, 2008 || Mount Lemmon || Mount Lemmon Survey || — || align=right | 1.5 km || 
|-id=754 bgcolor=#E9E9E9
| 320754 ||  || — || March 9, 2008 || Mount Lemmon || Mount Lemmon Survey || — || align=right | 1.2 km || 
|-id=755 bgcolor=#E9E9E9
| 320755 ||  || — || March 9, 2008 || Mount Lemmon || Mount Lemmon Survey || — || align=right | 1.7 km || 
|-id=756 bgcolor=#d6d6d6
| 320756 ||  || — || March 11, 2008 || Mount Lemmon || Mount Lemmon Survey || EUP || align=right | 6.8 km || 
|-id=757 bgcolor=#fefefe
| 320757 ||  || — || March 8, 2008 || Mount Lemmon || Mount Lemmon Survey || NYS || align=right data-sort-value="0.80" | 800 m || 
|-id=758 bgcolor=#E9E9E9
| 320758 ||  || — || March 7, 2008 || Kitt Peak || Spacewatch || — || align=right | 2.5 km || 
|-id=759 bgcolor=#E9E9E9
| 320759 ||  || — || March 7, 2008 || Kitt Peak || Spacewatch || — || align=right | 2.8 km || 
|-id=760 bgcolor=#E9E9E9
| 320760 ||  || — || March 7, 2008 || Kitt Peak || Spacewatch || — || align=right | 1.0 km || 
|-id=761 bgcolor=#E9E9E9
| 320761 ||  || — || March 7, 2008 || Kitt Peak || Spacewatch || — || align=right | 1.2 km || 
|-id=762 bgcolor=#fefefe
| 320762 ||  || — || March 4, 2008 || Socorro || LINEAR || — || align=right | 1.1 km || 
|-id=763 bgcolor=#E9E9E9
| 320763 ||  || — || March 8, 2008 || Socorro || LINEAR || BRG || align=right | 1.6 km || 
|-id=764 bgcolor=#E9E9E9
| 320764 ||  || — || March 7, 2008 || Catalina || CSS || — || align=right data-sort-value="0.81" | 810 m || 
|-id=765 bgcolor=#E9E9E9
| 320765 ||  || — || March 7, 2008 || Kitt Peak || Spacewatch || ADE || align=right | 2.6 km || 
|-id=766 bgcolor=#E9E9E9
| 320766 ||  || — || March 3, 2008 || Catalina || CSS || — || align=right | 2.6 km || 
|-id=767 bgcolor=#E9E9E9
| 320767 ||  || — || March 3, 2008 || Catalina || CSS || TIN || align=right | 1.5 km || 
|-id=768 bgcolor=#E9E9E9
| 320768 ||  || — || March 5, 2008 || Mount Lemmon || Mount Lemmon Survey || MRX || align=right | 1.1 km || 
|-id=769 bgcolor=#fefefe
| 320769 ||  || — || March 6, 2008 || Mount Lemmon || Mount Lemmon Survey || — || align=right | 1.2 km || 
|-id=770 bgcolor=#fefefe
| 320770 ||  || — || March 7, 2008 || Mount Lemmon || Mount Lemmon Survey || V || align=right data-sort-value="0.92" | 920 m || 
|-id=771 bgcolor=#E9E9E9
| 320771 ||  || — || March 6, 2008 || Mount Lemmon || Mount Lemmon Survey || NEM || align=right | 2.9 km || 
|-id=772 bgcolor=#E9E9E9
| 320772 ||  || — || March 8, 2008 || Kitt Peak || Spacewatch || IAN || align=right | 1.2 km || 
|-id=773 bgcolor=#fefefe
| 320773 ||  || — || March 9, 2008 || Mount Lemmon || Mount Lemmon Survey || NYS || align=right data-sort-value="0.80" | 800 m || 
|-id=774 bgcolor=#E9E9E9
| 320774 ||  || — || July 6, 2005 || Kitt Peak || Spacewatch || — || align=right | 1.0 km || 
|-id=775 bgcolor=#d6d6d6
| 320775 ||  || — || March 9, 2008 || Kitt Peak || Spacewatch || — || align=right | 2.4 km || 
|-id=776 bgcolor=#fefefe
| 320776 ||  || — || March 9, 2008 || Kitt Peak || Spacewatch || — || align=right data-sort-value="0.97" | 970 m || 
|-id=777 bgcolor=#E9E9E9
| 320777 ||  || — || March 9, 2008 || Kitt Peak || Spacewatch || — || align=right | 1.6 km || 
|-id=778 bgcolor=#E9E9E9
| 320778 ||  || — || March 9, 2008 || Kitt Peak || Spacewatch || WIT || align=right | 1.2 km || 
|-id=779 bgcolor=#E9E9E9
| 320779 ||  || — || February 29, 2008 || Kitt Peak || Spacewatch || — || align=right | 3.0 km || 
|-id=780 bgcolor=#d6d6d6
| 320780 ||  || — || March 11, 2008 || Kitt Peak || Spacewatch || — || align=right | 3.0 km || 
|-id=781 bgcolor=#E9E9E9
| 320781 ||  || — || March 11, 2008 || Kitt Peak || Spacewatch || — || align=right | 1.9 km || 
|-id=782 bgcolor=#E9E9E9
| 320782 ||  || — || March 11, 2008 || Kitt Peak || Spacewatch || — || align=right data-sort-value="0.89" | 890 m || 
|-id=783 bgcolor=#E9E9E9
| 320783 ||  || — || March 11, 2008 || Kitt Peak || Spacewatch || HOF || align=right | 2.4 km || 
|-id=784 bgcolor=#E9E9E9
| 320784 ||  || — || March 11, 2008 || Kitt Peak || Spacewatch || — || align=right | 1.5 km || 
|-id=785 bgcolor=#E9E9E9
| 320785 ||  || — || March 12, 2008 || Kitt Peak || Spacewatch || — || align=right data-sort-value="0.98" | 980 m || 
|-id=786 bgcolor=#fefefe
| 320786 ||  || — || March 12, 2008 || Kitt Peak || Spacewatch || NYS || align=right data-sort-value="0.86" | 860 m || 
|-id=787 bgcolor=#fefefe
| 320787 ||  || — || March 12, 2008 || Kitt Peak || Spacewatch || — || align=right | 1.0 km || 
|-id=788 bgcolor=#E9E9E9
| 320788 ||  || — || March 12, 2008 || Kitt Peak || Spacewatch || — || align=right | 2.9 km || 
|-id=789 bgcolor=#E9E9E9
| 320789 ||  || — || March 12, 2008 || Kitt Peak || Spacewatch || — || align=right | 1.6 km || 
|-id=790 bgcolor=#E9E9E9
| 320790 Anestin ||  ||  || March 12, 2008 || La Silla || EURONEAR || GER || align=right | 1.3 km || 
|-id=791 bgcolor=#E9E9E9
| 320791 ||  || — || March 5, 2008 || Mount Lemmon || Mount Lemmon Survey || — || align=right | 1.6 km || 
|-id=792 bgcolor=#E9E9E9
| 320792 ||  || — || March 2, 2008 || Kitt Peak || Spacewatch || — || align=right | 1.0 km || 
|-id=793 bgcolor=#E9E9E9
| 320793 ||  || — || March 2, 2008 || Mount Lemmon || Mount Lemmon Survey || — || align=right | 1.1 km || 
|-id=794 bgcolor=#E9E9E9
| 320794 ||  || — || March 10, 2008 || Kitt Peak || Spacewatch || — || align=right | 2.3 km || 
|-id=795 bgcolor=#d6d6d6
| 320795 ||  || — || March 12, 2008 || La Silla || La Silla Obs. || — || align=right | 2.8 km || 
|-id=796 bgcolor=#E9E9E9
| 320796 ||  || — || March 13, 2008 || Catalina || CSS || — || align=right | 2.3 km || 
|-id=797 bgcolor=#E9E9E9
| 320797 ||  || — || March 13, 2008 || Kitt Peak || Spacewatch || HNA || align=right | 2.5 km || 
|-id=798 bgcolor=#E9E9E9
| 320798 ||  || — || October 3, 2005 || Catalina || CSS || — || align=right | 3.7 km || 
|-id=799 bgcolor=#E9E9E9
| 320799 ||  || — || March 15, 2008 || Mount Lemmon || Mount Lemmon Survey || — || align=right | 1.3 km || 
|-id=800 bgcolor=#C2FFFF
| 320800 ||  || — || November 12, 2001 || Apache Point || SDSS || L5 || align=right | 9.6 km || 
|}

320801–320900 

|-bgcolor=#E9E9E9
| 320801 ||  || — || March 8, 2008 || Kitt Peak || Spacewatch || HOF || align=right | 2.5 km || 
|-id=802 bgcolor=#E9E9E9
| 320802 ||  || — || March 11, 2008 || Kitt Peak || Spacewatch || — || align=right | 1.8 km || 
|-id=803 bgcolor=#E9E9E9
| 320803 ||  || — || September 11, 2005 || Kitt Peak || Spacewatch || WIT || align=right data-sort-value="0.86" | 860 m || 
|-id=804 bgcolor=#fefefe
| 320804 ||  || — || March 10, 2008 || Socorro || LINEAR || V || align=right | 1.1 km || 
|-id=805 bgcolor=#E9E9E9
| 320805 ||  || — || March 4, 2008 || Mount Lemmon || Mount Lemmon Survey || — || align=right | 2.5 km || 
|-id=806 bgcolor=#E9E9E9
| 320806 ||  || — || March 4, 2008 || Mount Lemmon || Mount Lemmon Survey || — || align=right | 2.1 km || 
|-id=807 bgcolor=#E9E9E9
| 320807 ||  || — || March 5, 2008 || Mount Lemmon || Mount Lemmon Survey || — || align=right | 1.6 km || 
|-id=808 bgcolor=#E9E9E9
| 320808 ||  || — || March 6, 2008 || Kitt Peak || Spacewatch || HEN || align=right | 1.0 km || 
|-id=809 bgcolor=#fefefe
| 320809 ||  || — || March 8, 2008 || Socorro || LINEAR || V || align=right | 1.1 km || 
|-id=810 bgcolor=#E9E9E9
| 320810 ||  || — || March 27, 2008 || Great Shefford || P. Birtwhistle || — || align=right | 1.1 km || 
|-id=811 bgcolor=#E9E9E9
| 320811 ||  || — || March 26, 2008 || Kitt Peak || Spacewatch || — || align=right | 1.0 km || 
|-id=812 bgcolor=#E9E9E9
| 320812 ||  || — || March 26, 2008 || Kitt Peak || Spacewatch || — || align=right | 1.6 km || 
|-id=813 bgcolor=#E9E9E9
| 320813 ||  || — || March 26, 2008 || Mount Lemmon || Mount Lemmon Survey || WIT || align=right | 1.0 km || 
|-id=814 bgcolor=#E9E9E9
| 320814 ||  || — || March 26, 2008 || Mount Lemmon || Mount Lemmon Survey || — || align=right | 2.6 km || 
|-id=815 bgcolor=#E9E9E9
| 320815 ||  || — || March 26, 2008 || Mount Lemmon || Mount Lemmon Survey || — || align=right data-sort-value="0.78" | 780 m || 
|-id=816 bgcolor=#E9E9E9
| 320816 ||  || — || March 26, 2008 || Kitt Peak || Spacewatch || EUN || align=right | 1.7 km || 
|-id=817 bgcolor=#E9E9E9
| 320817 ||  || — || March 27, 2008 || Kitt Peak || Spacewatch || — || align=right | 2.1 km || 
|-id=818 bgcolor=#E9E9E9
| 320818 ||  || — || March 27, 2008 || Kitt Peak || Spacewatch || — || align=right | 1.9 km || 
|-id=819 bgcolor=#E9E9E9
| 320819 ||  || — || March 5, 2008 || Mount Lemmon || Mount Lemmon Survey || — || align=right | 2.7 km || 
|-id=820 bgcolor=#fefefe
| 320820 ||  || — || March 27, 2008 || Kitt Peak || Spacewatch || NYS || align=right data-sort-value="0.76" | 760 m || 
|-id=821 bgcolor=#E9E9E9
| 320821 ||  || — || March 27, 2008 || Kitt Peak || Spacewatch || — || align=right | 2.8 km || 
|-id=822 bgcolor=#E9E9E9
| 320822 ||  || — || March 27, 2008 || Kitt Peak || Spacewatch || JUN || align=right | 1.3 km || 
|-id=823 bgcolor=#E9E9E9
| 320823 ||  || — || March 28, 2008 || Kitt Peak || Spacewatch || — || align=right | 1.0 km || 
|-id=824 bgcolor=#E9E9E9
| 320824 ||  || — || March 28, 2008 || Mount Lemmon || Mount Lemmon Survey || — || align=right | 1.4 km || 
|-id=825 bgcolor=#E9E9E9
| 320825 ||  || — || March 28, 2008 || Kitt Peak || Spacewatch || — || align=right | 1.3 km || 
|-id=826 bgcolor=#E9E9E9
| 320826 ||  || — || March 28, 2008 || Kitt Peak || Spacewatch || — || align=right | 2.3 km || 
|-id=827 bgcolor=#E9E9E9
| 320827 ||  || — || March 28, 2008 || Kitt Peak || Spacewatch || — || align=right | 1.5 km || 
|-id=828 bgcolor=#E9E9E9
| 320828 ||  || — || March 28, 2008 || Kitt Peak || Spacewatch || — || align=right | 1.6 km || 
|-id=829 bgcolor=#E9E9E9
| 320829 ||  || — || March 28, 2008 || Mount Lemmon || Mount Lemmon Survey || — || align=right | 2.0 km || 
|-id=830 bgcolor=#fefefe
| 320830 ||  || — || March 28, 2008 || Mount Lemmon || Mount Lemmon Survey || NYS || align=right data-sort-value="0.76" | 760 m || 
|-id=831 bgcolor=#E9E9E9
| 320831 ||  || — || March 28, 2008 || Mount Lemmon || Mount Lemmon Survey || HEN || align=right | 1.1 km || 
|-id=832 bgcolor=#E9E9E9
| 320832 ||  || — || March 28, 2008 || Mount Lemmon || Mount Lemmon Survey || — || align=right | 1.5 km || 
|-id=833 bgcolor=#E9E9E9
| 320833 ||  || — || March 28, 2008 || Mount Lemmon || Mount Lemmon Survey || — || align=right | 2.2 km || 
|-id=834 bgcolor=#E9E9E9
| 320834 ||  || — || March 28, 2008 || Mount Lemmon || Mount Lemmon Survey || — || align=right | 2.8 km || 
|-id=835 bgcolor=#E9E9E9
| 320835 ||  || — || March 29, 2008 || Catalina || CSS || — || align=right | 2.2 km || 
|-id=836 bgcolor=#E9E9E9
| 320836 ||  || — || March 30, 2008 || Kitt Peak || Spacewatch || ADE || align=right | 1.7 km || 
|-id=837 bgcolor=#E9E9E9
| 320837 ||  || — || March 27, 2008 || Kitt Peak || Spacewatch || — || align=right data-sort-value="0.91" | 910 m || 
|-id=838 bgcolor=#E9E9E9
| 320838 ||  || — || March 27, 2008 || Kitt Peak || Spacewatch || — || align=right | 2.6 km || 
|-id=839 bgcolor=#E9E9E9
| 320839 ||  || — || March 28, 2008 || Kitt Peak || Spacewatch || — || align=right | 2.4 km || 
|-id=840 bgcolor=#d6d6d6
| 320840 ||  || — || March 28, 2008 || Mount Lemmon || Mount Lemmon Survey || HYG || align=right | 2.8 km || 
|-id=841 bgcolor=#E9E9E9
| 320841 ||  || — || March 28, 2008 || Mount Lemmon || Mount Lemmon Survey || ADE || align=right | 2.4 km || 
|-id=842 bgcolor=#E9E9E9
| 320842 ||  || — || March 30, 2008 || Kitt Peak || Spacewatch || — || align=right data-sort-value="0.98" | 980 m || 
|-id=843 bgcolor=#E9E9E9
| 320843 ||  || — || March 27, 2008 || Mount Lemmon || Mount Lemmon Survey || — || align=right | 1.8 km || 
|-id=844 bgcolor=#E9E9E9
| 320844 ||  || — || March 27, 2008 || Mount Lemmon || Mount Lemmon Survey || — || align=right | 2.3 km || 
|-id=845 bgcolor=#E9E9E9
| 320845 ||  || — || March 27, 2008 || Mount Lemmon || Mount Lemmon Survey || — || align=right data-sort-value="0.84" | 840 m || 
|-id=846 bgcolor=#E9E9E9
| 320846 ||  || — || March 28, 2008 || Mount Lemmon || Mount Lemmon Survey || — || align=right | 1.6 km || 
|-id=847 bgcolor=#E9E9E9
| 320847 ||  || — || March 29, 2008 || Kitt Peak || Spacewatch || HOF || align=right | 3.0 km || 
|-id=848 bgcolor=#E9E9E9
| 320848 ||  || — || March 29, 2008 || Mount Lemmon || Mount Lemmon Survey || — || align=right | 3.8 km || 
|-id=849 bgcolor=#E9E9E9
| 320849 ||  || — || March 30, 2008 || Kitt Peak || Spacewatch || GEF || align=right | 1.3 km || 
|-id=850 bgcolor=#E9E9E9
| 320850 ||  || — || March 30, 2008 || Catalina || CSS || ADE || align=right | 2.6 km || 
|-id=851 bgcolor=#E9E9E9
| 320851 ||  || — || March 30, 2008 || Kitt Peak || Spacewatch || — || align=right | 2.3 km || 
|-id=852 bgcolor=#E9E9E9
| 320852 ||  || — || March 30, 2008 || Kitt Peak || Spacewatch || — || align=right | 1.7 km || 
|-id=853 bgcolor=#d6d6d6
| 320853 ||  || — || March 30, 2008 || Kitt Peak || Spacewatch || — || align=right | 3.7 km || 
|-id=854 bgcolor=#E9E9E9
| 320854 ||  || — || March 31, 2008 || Mount Lemmon || Mount Lemmon Survey || GAL || align=right | 1.8 km || 
|-id=855 bgcolor=#fefefe
| 320855 ||  || — || March 31, 2008 || Kitt Peak || Spacewatch || — || align=right | 1.2 km || 
|-id=856 bgcolor=#E9E9E9
| 320856 ||  || — || March 31, 2008 || Mount Lemmon || Mount Lemmon Survey || AEO || align=right data-sort-value="0.90" | 900 m || 
|-id=857 bgcolor=#E9E9E9
| 320857 ||  || — || March 31, 2008 || Mount Lemmon || Mount Lemmon Survey || — || align=right | 1.5 km || 
|-id=858 bgcolor=#E9E9E9
| 320858 ||  || — || March 31, 2008 || Mount Lemmon || Mount Lemmon Survey || — || align=right | 1.7 km || 
|-id=859 bgcolor=#fefefe
| 320859 ||  || — || March 31, 2008 || Kitt Peak || Spacewatch || — || align=right data-sort-value="0.91" | 910 m || 
|-id=860 bgcolor=#E9E9E9
| 320860 ||  || — || March 28, 2008 || Mount Lemmon || Mount Lemmon Survey || — || align=right | 2.1 km || 
|-id=861 bgcolor=#E9E9E9
| 320861 ||  || — || March 31, 2008 || Mount Lemmon || Mount Lemmon Survey || — || align=right | 1.5 km || 
|-id=862 bgcolor=#E9E9E9
| 320862 ||  || — || March 26, 2008 || Kitt Peak || Spacewatch || — || align=right | 1.1 km || 
|-id=863 bgcolor=#E9E9E9
| 320863 ||  || — || March 29, 2008 || Catalina || CSS || — || align=right | 2.4 km || 
|-id=864 bgcolor=#E9E9E9
| 320864 ||  || — || March 29, 2008 || Kitt Peak || Spacewatch || ADE || align=right | 2.8 km || 
|-id=865 bgcolor=#d6d6d6
| 320865 ||  || — || March 29, 2008 || Kitt Peak || Spacewatch || — || align=right | 2.2 km || 
|-id=866 bgcolor=#E9E9E9
| 320866 ||  || — || March 29, 2008 || Kitt Peak || Spacewatch || — || align=right | 2.5 km || 
|-id=867 bgcolor=#E9E9E9
| 320867 ||  || — || March 31, 2008 || Catalina || CSS || JUN || align=right | 1.3 km || 
|-id=868 bgcolor=#E9E9E9
| 320868 ||  || — || April 3, 2008 || La Sagra || OAM Obs. || EUN || align=right | 1.9 km || 
|-id=869 bgcolor=#E9E9E9
| 320869 ||  || — || April 5, 2008 || Eskridge || G. Hug || — || align=right data-sort-value="0.98" | 980 m || 
|-id=870 bgcolor=#E9E9E9
| 320870 ||  || — || April 4, 2008 || Grove Creek || F. Tozzi || — || align=right | 2.4 km || 
|-id=871 bgcolor=#E9E9E9
| 320871 ||  || — || April 4, 2008 || Grove Creek || F. Tozzi || — || align=right | 2.6 km || 
|-id=872 bgcolor=#E9E9E9
| 320872 ||  || — || April 1, 2008 || Kitt Peak || Spacewatch || — || align=right | 1.6 km || 
|-id=873 bgcolor=#E9E9E9
| 320873 ||  || — || August 30, 2005 || Kitt Peak || Spacewatch || — || align=right | 1.7 km || 
|-id=874 bgcolor=#E9E9E9
| 320874 ||  || — || April 3, 2008 || Kitt Peak || Spacewatch || NEM || align=right | 2.5 km || 
|-id=875 bgcolor=#fefefe
| 320875 ||  || — || April 3, 2008 || Kitt Peak || Spacewatch || — || align=right data-sort-value="0.98" | 980 m || 
|-id=876 bgcolor=#E9E9E9
| 320876 ||  || — || April 3, 2008 || Kitt Peak || Spacewatch || — || align=right | 3.0 km || 
|-id=877 bgcolor=#E9E9E9
| 320877 ||  || — || April 4, 2008 || Mount Lemmon || Mount Lemmon Survey || — || align=right | 2.1 km || 
|-id=878 bgcolor=#fefefe
| 320878 ||  || — || April 4, 2008 || Mount Lemmon || Mount Lemmon Survey || NYS || align=right data-sort-value="0.64" | 640 m || 
|-id=879 bgcolor=#E9E9E9
| 320879 ||  || — || April 12, 2008 || Mayhill || W. G. Dillon || RAF || align=right data-sort-value="0.89" | 890 m || 
|-id=880 bgcolor=#E9E9E9
| 320880 Cabu ||  ||  || April 11, 2008 || Nogales || J.-C. Merlin || — || align=right | 2.0 km || 
|-id=881 bgcolor=#E9E9E9
| 320881 ||  || — || April 1, 2008 || Mount Lemmon || Mount Lemmon Survey || AGN || align=right | 1.3 km || 
|-id=882 bgcolor=#E9E9E9
| 320882 ||  || — || March 4, 2008 || Mount Lemmon || Mount Lemmon Survey || AGN || align=right | 1.2 km || 
|-id=883 bgcolor=#E9E9E9
| 320883 ||  || — || April 3, 2008 || Kitt Peak || Spacewatch || — || align=right | 1.4 km || 
|-id=884 bgcolor=#fefefe
| 320884 ||  || — || April 3, 2008 || Kitt Peak || Spacewatch || — || align=right | 1.1 km || 
|-id=885 bgcolor=#E9E9E9
| 320885 ||  || — || January 27, 2004 || Kitt Peak || Spacewatch || — || align=right | 1.8 km || 
|-id=886 bgcolor=#E9E9E9
| 320886 ||  || — || April 4, 2008 || Kitt Peak || Spacewatch || — || align=right | 1.9 km || 
|-id=887 bgcolor=#E9E9E9
| 320887 ||  || — || April 4, 2008 || Kitt Peak || Spacewatch || — || align=right | 3.0 km || 
|-id=888 bgcolor=#E9E9E9
| 320888 ||  || — || April 5, 2008 || Kitt Peak || Spacewatch || — || align=right data-sort-value="0.81" | 810 m || 
|-id=889 bgcolor=#E9E9E9
| 320889 ||  || — || April 5, 2008 || Mount Lemmon || Mount Lemmon Survey || — || align=right | 1.3 km || 
|-id=890 bgcolor=#E9E9E9
| 320890 ||  || — || April 5, 2008 || Mount Lemmon || Mount Lemmon Survey || — || align=right | 1.3 km || 
|-id=891 bgcolor=#E9E9E9
| 320891 ||  || — || April 5, 2008 || Mount Lemmon || Mount Lemmon Survey || — || align=right | 2.5 km || 
|-id=892 bgcolor=#C2FFFF
| 320892 ||  || — || April 5, 2008 || Mount Lemmon || Mount Lemmon Survey || L5 || align=right | 9.4 km || 
|-id=893 bgcolor=#d6d6d6
| 320893 ||  || — || April 5, 2008 || Kitt Peak || Spacewatch || KOR || align=right | 1.4 km || 
|-id=894 bgcolor=#E9E9E9
| 320894 ||  || — || April 5, 2008 || Catalina || CSS || — || align=right | 2.4 km || 
|-id=895 bgcolor=#E9E9E9
| 320895 ||  || — || April 5, 2008 || Catalina || CSS || — || align=right | 1.3 km || 
|-id=896 bgcolor=#E9E9E9
| 320896 ||  || — || April 6, 2008 || Kitt Peak || Spacewatch || — || align=right | 2.6 km || 
|-id=897 bgcolor=#E9E9E9
| 320897 ||  || — || April 6, 2008 || Kitt Peak || Spacewatch || WIT || align=right | 1.2 km || 
|-id=898 bgcolor=#E9E9E9
| 320898 ||  || — || April 6, 2008 || Kitt Peak || Spacewatch || — || align=right | 2.0 km || 
|-id=899 bgcolor=#E9E9E9
| 320899 ||  || — || April 6, 2008 || Mount Lemmon || Mount Lemmon Survey || — || align=right | 2.2 km || 
|-id=900 bgcolor=#E9E9E9
| 320900 ||  || — || April 7, 2008 || Mount Lemmon || Mount Lemmon Survey || ADE || align=right | 2.0 km || 
|}

320901–321000 

|-bgcolor=#E9E9E9
| 320901 ||  || — || April 7, 2008 || Kitt Peak || Spacewatch || — || align=right | 1.7 km || 
|-id=902 bgcolor=#E9E9E9
| 320902 ||  || — || April 7, 2008 || Kitt Peak || Spacewatch || — || align=right | 2.6 km || 
|-id=903 bgcolor=#E9E9E9
| 320903 ||  || — || April 7, 2008 || Kitt Peak || Spacewatch || — || align=right | 2.5 km || 
|-id=904 bgcolor=#E9E9E9
| 320904 ||  || — || April 7, 2008 || Kitt Peak || Spacewatch || — || align=right | 2.3 km || 
|-id=905 bgcolor=#E9E9E9
| 320905 ||  || — || April 7, 2008 || Kitt Peak || Spacewatch || ADE || align=right | 2.4 km || 
|-id=906 bgcolor=#E9E9E9
| 320906 ||  || — || April 8, 2008 || Kitt Peak || Spacewatch || GEF || align=right | 1.6 km || 
|-id=907 bgcolor=#E9E9E9
| 320907 ||  || — || April 8, 2008 || Kitt Peak || Spacewatch || CLO || align=right | 2.2 km || 
|-id=908 bgcolor=#E9E9E9
| 320908 ||  || — || April 8, 2008 || Kitt Peak || Spacewatch || — || align=right | 3.0 km || 
|-id=909 bgcolor=#E9E9E9
| 320909 ||  || — || April 9, 2008 || Kitt Peak || Spacewatch || — || align=right | 2.3 km || 
|-id=910 bgcolor=#E9E9E9
| 320910 ||  || — || April 9, 2008 || Kitt Peak || Spacewatch || — || align=right | 2.2 km || 
|-id=911 bgcolor=#E9E9E9
| 320911 ||  || — || April 6, 2008 || Kitt Peak || Spacewatch || — || align=right data-sort-value="0.97" | 970 m || 
|-id=912 bgcolor=#E9E9E9
| 320912 ||  || — || April 6, 2008 || Mount Lemmon || Mount Lemmon Survey || — || align=right | 2.8 km || 
|-id=913 bgcolor=#E9E9E9
| 320913 ||  || — || April 7, 2008 || Kitt Peak || Spacewatch || — || align=right | 1.8 km || 
|-id=914 bgcolor=#d6d6d6
| 320914 ||  || — || April 8, 2008 || Kitt Peak || Spacewatch || — || align=right | 3.1 km || 
|-id=915 bgcolor=#E9E9E9
| 320915 ||  || — || April 8, 2008 || Kitt Peak || Spacewatch || — || align=right | 1.8 km || 
|-id=916 bgcolor=#E9E9E9
| 320916 ||  || — || April 8, 2008 || Kitt Peak || Spacewatch || — || align=right | 2.3 km || 
|-id=917 bgcolor=#d6d6d6
| 320917 ||  || — || April 9, 2008 || Kitt Peak || Spacewatch || EOS || align=right | 2.4 km || 
|-id=918 bgcolor=#E9E9E9
| 320918 ||  || — || February 10, 2008 || Mount Lemmon || Mount Lemmon Survey || — || align=right | 1.7 km || 
|-id=919 bgcolor=#fefefe
| 320919 ||  || — || April 10, 2008 || Kitt Peak || Spacewatch || — || align=right | 1.5 km || 
|-id=920 bgcolor=#d6d6d6
| 320920 ||  || — || April 10, 2008 || Kitt Peak || Spacewatch || FIR || align=right | 4.3 km || 
|-id=921 bgcolor=#d6d6d6
| 320921 ||  || — || April 11, 2008 || Kitt Peak || Spacewatch || — || align=right | 2.9 km || 
|-id=922 bgcolor=#E9E9E9
| 320922 ||  || — || April 11, 2008 || Kitt Peak || Spacewatch || — || align=right | 2.4 km || 
|-id=923 bgcolor=#E9E9E9
| 320923 ||  || — || April 11, 2008 || Catalina || CSS || — || align=right | 3.2 km || 
|-id=924 bgcolor=#d6d6d6
| 320924 ||  || — || April 12, 2008 || Mount Lemmon || Mount Lemmon Survey || EOS || align=right | 2.1 km || 
|-id=925 bgcolor=#E9E9E9
| 320925 ||  || — || April 8, 2008 || Socorro || LINEAR || — || align=right | 2.8 km || 
|-id=926 bgcolor=#E9E9E9
| 320926 ||  || — || April 8, 2008 || Mount Lemmon || Mount Lemmon Survey || — || align=right | 1.1 km || 
|-id=927 bgcolor=#E9E9E9
| 320927 ||  || — || April 8, 2008 || Mount Lemmon || Mount Lemmon Survey || — || align=right | 1.5 km || 
|-id=928 bgcolor=#E9E9E9
| 320928 ||  || — || April 9, 2008 || Kitt Peak || Spacewatch || EUN || align=right | 1.4 km || 
|-id=929 bgcolor=#E9E9E9
| 320929 ||  || — || April 12, 2008 || Catalina || CSS || — || align=right | 1.1 km || 
|-id=930 bgcolor=#E9E9E9
| 320930 ||  || — || April 12, 2008 || Dauban || F. Kugel || — || align=right | 2.1 km || 
|-id=931 bgcolor=#E9E9E9
| 320931 ||  || — || March 31, 2008 || Kitt Peak || Spacewatch || — || align=right | 3.0 km || 
|-id=932 bgcolor=#E9E9E9
| 320932 ||  || — || April 13, 2008 || Kitt Peak || Spacewatch || ADE || align=right | 1.9 km || 
|-id=933 bgcolor=#E9E9E9
| 320933 ||  || — || April 14, 2008 || Mount Lemmon || Mount Lemmon Survey || — || align=right | 2.1 km || 
|-id=934 bgcolor=#E9E9E9
| 320934 ||  || — || April 15, 2008 || Catalina || CSS || — || align=right | 1.5 km || 
|-id=935 bgcolor=#E9E9E9
| 320935 ||  || — || April 5, 2008 || Catalina || CSS || EUN || align=right | 1.7 km || 
|-id=936 bgcolor=#d6d6d6
| 320936 ||  || — || April 6, 2008 || Kitt Peak || Spacewatch || — || align=right | 2.6 km || 
|-id=937 bgcolor=#E9E9E9
| 320937 ||  || — || April 3, 2008 || Kitt Peak || Spacewatch || NEM || align=right | 2.5 km || 
|-id=938 bgcolor=#E9E9E9
| 320938 ||  || — || April 10, 2008 || Kitt Peak || Spacewatch || HOF || align=right | 3.3 km || 
|-id=939 bgcolor=#E9E9E9
| 320939 ||  || — || April 15, 2008 || Mount Lemmon || Mount Lemmon Survey || — || align=right | 2.2 km || 
|-id=940 bgcolor=#E9E9E9
| 320940 ||  || — || April 5, 2008 || Catalina || CSS || — || align=right | 1.6 km || 
|-id=941 bgcolor=#E9E9E9
| 320941 ||  || — || October 15, 2001 || Kitt Peak || Spacewatch || — || align=right | 1.2 km || 
|-id=942 bgcolor=#E9E9E9
| 320942 Jeanette-Jesse ||  ||  || April 5, 2008 || Anderson Mesa || L. H. Wasserman || — || align=right | 1.6 km || 
|-id=943 bgcolor=#E9E9E9
| 320943 ||  || — || April 6, 2008 || Kitt Peak || Spacewatch || — || align=right | 3.4 km || 
|-id=944 bgcolor=#E9E9E9
| 320944 ||  || — || April 24, 2008 || Mount Lemmon || Mount Lemmon Survey || — || align=right data-sort-value="0.98" | 980 m || 
|-id=945 bgcolor=#E9E9E9
| 320945 ||  || — || April 24, 2008 || Kitt Peak || Spacewatch || JUN || align=right | 1.1 km || 
|-id=946 bgcolor=#d6d6d6
| 320946 ||  || — || April 24, 2008 || Kitt Peak || Spacewatch || TRP || align=right | 2.5 km || 
|-id=947 bgcolor=#E9E9E9
| 320947 ||  || — || April 24, 2008 || Kitt Peak || Spacewatch || — || align=right | 1.7 km || 
|-id=948 bgcolor=#E9E9E9
| 320948 ||  || — || April 25, 2008 || La Sagra || OAM Obs. || — || align=right | 1.1 km || 
|-id=949 bgcolor=#E9E9E9
| 320949 ||  || — || April 26, 2008 || Bergisch Gladbac || W. Bickel || — || align=right | 2.4 km || 
|-id=950 bgcolor=#C2FFFF
| 320950 ||  || — || April 24, 2008 || Kitt Peak || Spacewatch || L5 || align=right | 11 km || 
|-id=951 bgcolor=#E9E9E9
| 320951 ||  || — || April 24, 2008 || Kitt Peak || Spacewatch || — || align=right | 2.6 km || 
|-id=952 bgcolor=#E9E9E9
| 320952 ||  || — || April 24, 2008 || Kitt Peak || Spacewatch || — || align=right | 1.2 km || 
|-id=953 bgcolor=#E9E9E9
| 320953 ||  || — || April 24, 2008 || Catalina || CSS || — || align=right | 2.3 km || 
|-id=954 bgcolor=#fefefe
| 320954 ||  || — || April 25, 2008 || Kitt Peak || Spacewatch || — || align=right | 1.2 km || 
|-id=955 bgcolor=#d6d6d6
| 320955 ||  || — || April 25, 2008 || Kitt Peak || Spacewatch || — || align=right | 3.1 km || 
|-id=956 bgcolor=#E9E9E9
| 320956 ||  || — || April 26, 2008 || Kitt Peak || Spacewatch || — || align=right | 2.7 km || 
|-id=957 bgcolor=#E9E9E9
| 320957 ||  || — || April 26, 2008 || Kitt Peak || Spacewatch || — || align=right | 2.1 km || 
|-id=958 bgcolor=#E9E9E9
| 320958 ||  || — || April 26, 2008 || Mount Lemmon || Mount Lemmon Survey || — || align=right | 2.1 km || 
|-id=959 bgcolor=#E9E9E9
| 320959 ||  || — || April 26, 2008 || Kitt Peak || Spacewatch || — || align=right | 2.1 km || 
|-id=960 bgcolor=#E9E9E9
| 320960 ||  || — || April 27, 2008 || Kitt Peak || Spacewatch || — || align=right | 2.5 km || 
|-id=961 bgcolor=#E9E9E9
| 320961 ||  || — || April 28, 2008 || Kitt Peak || Spacewatch || — || align=right | 1.6 km || 
|-id=962 bgcolor=#E9E9E9
| 320962 ||  || — || April 27, 2008 || Kitt Peak || Spacewatch || — || align=right | 2.1 km || 
|-id=963 bgcolor=#E9E9E9
| 320963 ||  || — || April 27, 2008 || Kitt Peak || Spacewatch || — || align=right | 2.4 km || 
|-id=964 bgcolor=#E9E9E9
| 320964 ||  || — || April 27, 2008 || Mount Lemmon || Mount Lemmon Survey || — || align=right | 2.0 km || 
|-id=965 bgcolor=#d6d6d6
| 320965 ||  || — || April 27, 2008 || Mount Lemmon || Mount Lemmon Survey || URS || align=right | 3.6 km || 
|-id=966 bgcolor=#E9E9E9
| 320966 ||  || — || April 29, 2008 || Kitt Peak || Spacewatch || — || align=right | 2.3 km || 
|-id=967 bgcolor=#E9E9E9
| 320967 ||  || — || April 26, 2008 || Mount Lemmon || Mount Lemmon Survey || — || align=right | 1.9 km || 
|-id=968 bgcolor=#E9E9E9
| 320968 ||  || — || April 27, 2008 || Mount Lemmon || Mount Lemmon Survey || — || align=right | 1.9 km || 
|-id=969 bgcolor=#d6d6d6
| 320969 ||  || — || April 28, 2008 || Kitt Peak || Spacewatch || — || align=right | 4.0 km || 
|-id=970 bgcolor=#E9E9E9
| 320970 ||  || — || April 28, 2008 || Kitt Peak || Spacewatch || HEN || align=right | 1.4 km || 
|-id=971 bgcolor=#E9E9E9
| 320971 ||  || — || April 28, 2008 || Mount Lemmon || Mount Lemmon Survey || — || align=right | 3.7 km || 
|-id=972 bgcolor=#d6d6d6
| 320972 ||  || — || April 14, 2008 || Mount Lemmon || Mount Lemmon Survey || EOS || align=right | 2.3 km || 
|-id=973 bgcolor=#E9E9E9
| 320973 ||  || — || May 2, 2008 || Kitt Peak || Spacewatch || NEM || align=right | 3.3 km || 
|-id=974 bgcolor=#E9E9E9
| 320974 ||  || — || May 1, 2008 || Kitt Peak || Spacewatch || — || align=right | 3.4 km || 
|-id=975 bgcolor=#E9E9E9
| 320975 ||  || — || May 1, 2008 || Kitt Peak || Spacewatch || DOR || align=right | 2.9 km || 
|-id=976 bgcolor=#E9E9E9
| 320976 ||  || — || May 2, 2008 || Kitt Peak || Spacewatch || — || align=right | 2.3 km || 
|-id=977 bgcolor=#d6d6d6
| 320977 ||  || — || May 4, 2008 || Moletai || Molėtai Obs. || — || align=right | 2.8 km || 
|-id=978 bgcolor=#E9E9E9
| 320978 ||  || — || May 1, 2008 || Catalina || CSS || RAF || align=right | 1.2 km || 
|-id=979 bgcolor=#E9E9E9
| 320979 ||  || — || May 2, 2008 || Kitt Peak || Spacewatch || HOF || align=right | 3.2 km || 
|-id=980 bgcolor=#E9E9E9
| 320980 ||  || — || May 3, 2008 || Kitt Peak || Spacewatch || — || align=right | 2.4 km || 
|-id=981 bgcolor=#d6d6d6
| 320981 ||  || — || May 3, 2008 || Kitt Peak || Spacewatch || — || align=right | 3.8 km || 
|-id=982 bgcolor=#d6d6d6
| 320982 ||  || — || May 5, 2008 || Mount Lemmon || Mount Lemmon Survey || — || align=right | 2.9 km || 
|-id=983 bgcolor=#E9E9E9
| 320983 ||  || — || May 7, 2008 || Skylive Obs. || F. Tozzi || JUN || align=right | 1.4 km || 
|-id=984 bgcolor=#E9E9E9
| 320984 ||  || — || December 17, 2007 || Mount Lemmon || Mount Lemmon Survey || — || align=right | 1.7 km || 
|-id=985 bgcolor=#d6d6d6
| 320985 ||  || — || May 7, 2008 || Kitt Peak || Spacewatch || K-2 || align=right | 1.3 km || 
|-id=986 bgcolor=#E9E9E9
| 320986 ||  || — || May 8, 2008 || Jarnac || Jarnac Obs. || RAF || align=right | 1.2 km || 
|-id=987 bgcolor=#E9E9E9
| 320987 ||  || — || October 29, 2005 || Catalina || CSS || EUN || align=right | 1.9 km || 
|-id=988 bgcolor=#E9E9E9
| 320988 ||  || — || May 8, 2008 || Kitt Peak || Spacewatch || — || align=right | 1.5 km || 
|-id=989 bgcolor=#d6d6d6
| 320989 ||  || — || May 15, 2008 || Mount Lemmon || Mount Lemmon Survey || Tj (2.96) || align=right | 6.2 km || 
|-id=990 bgcolor=#E9E9E9
| 320990 ||  || — || May 3, 2008 || Kitt Peak || Spacewatch || AGN || align=right | 1.1 km || 
|-id=991 bgcolor=#d6d6d6
| 320991 ||  || — || May 27, 2008 || Kitt Peak || Spacewatch || — || align=right | 2.7 km || 
|-id=992 bgcolor=#E9E9E9
| 320992 ||  || — || May 27, 2008 || Kitt Peak || Spacewatch || — || align=right | 2.4 km || 
|-id=993 bgcolor=#d6d6d6
| 320993 ||  || — || May 27, 2008 || Kitt Peak || Spacewatch || — || align=right | 2.8 km || 
|-id=994 bgcolor=#d6d6d6
| 320994 ||  || — || May 28, 2008 || Kitt Peak || Spacewatch || — || align=right | 3.6 km || 
|-id=995 bgcolor=#E9E9E9
| 320995 ||  || — || May 26, 2008 || Kitt Peak || Spacewatch || DOR || align=right | 2.4 km || 
|-id=996 bgcolor=#E9E9E9
| 320996 ||  || — || May 26, 2008 || Kitt Peak || Spacewatch || KRM || align=right | 2.8 km || 
|-id=997 bgcolor=#E9E9E9
| 320997 ||  || — || May 28, 2008 || Grove Creek || F. Tozzi || — || align=right | 2.2 km || 
|-id=998 bgcolor=#d6d6d6
| 320998 ||  || — || May 26, 2008 || Kitt Peak || Spacewatch || — || align=right | 2.9 km || 
|-id=999 bgcolor=#fefefe
| 320999 ||  || — || May 27, 2008 || Kitt Peak || Spacewatch || — || align=right data-sort-value="0.85" | 850 m || 
|-id=000 bgcolor=#d6d6d6
| 321000 ||  || — || May 27, 2008 || Kitt Peak || Spacewatch || THM || align=right | 2.3 km || 
|}

References

External links 
 Discovery Circumstances: Numbered Minor Planets (320001)–(325000) (IAU Minor Planet Center)

0320